= Puebla (city) =

Puebla Puebla de Zaragoza Puebla de los Ángeles, Cuetlaxcoapan
- Metropolis
- Heroica Puebla de Zaragoza
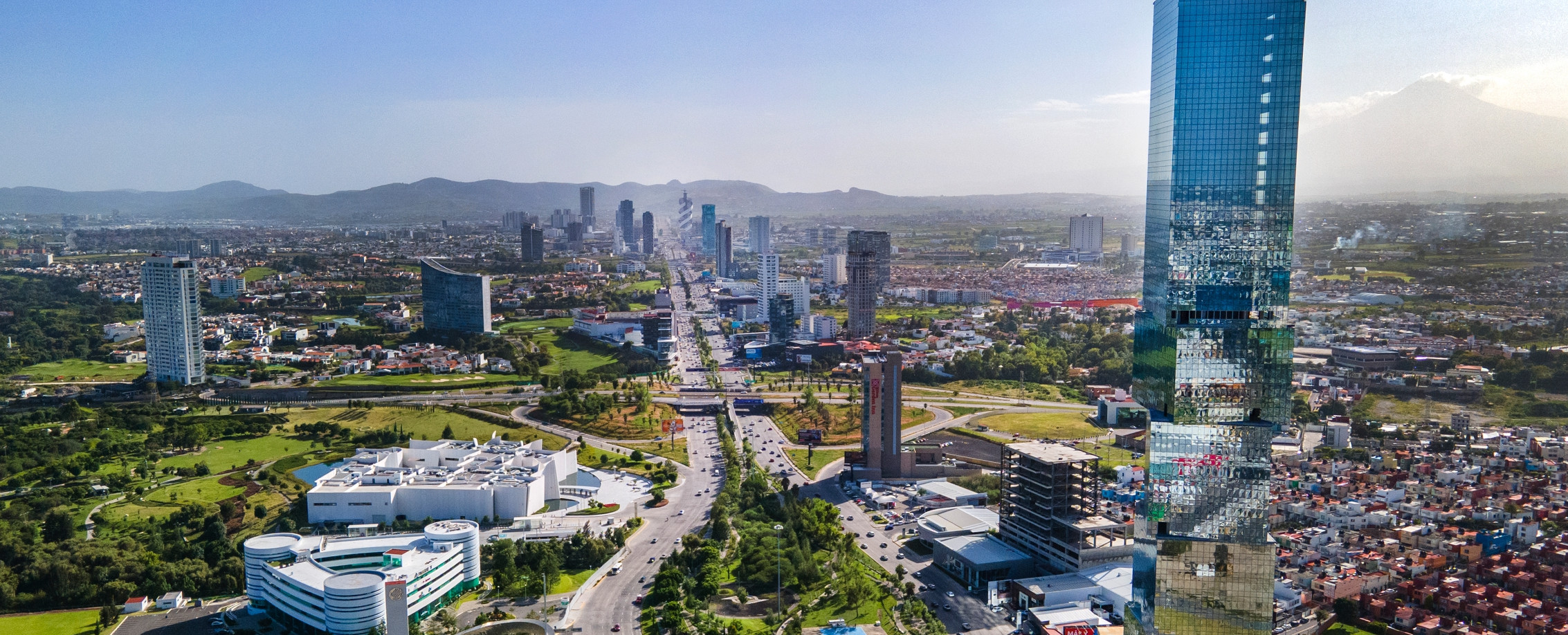
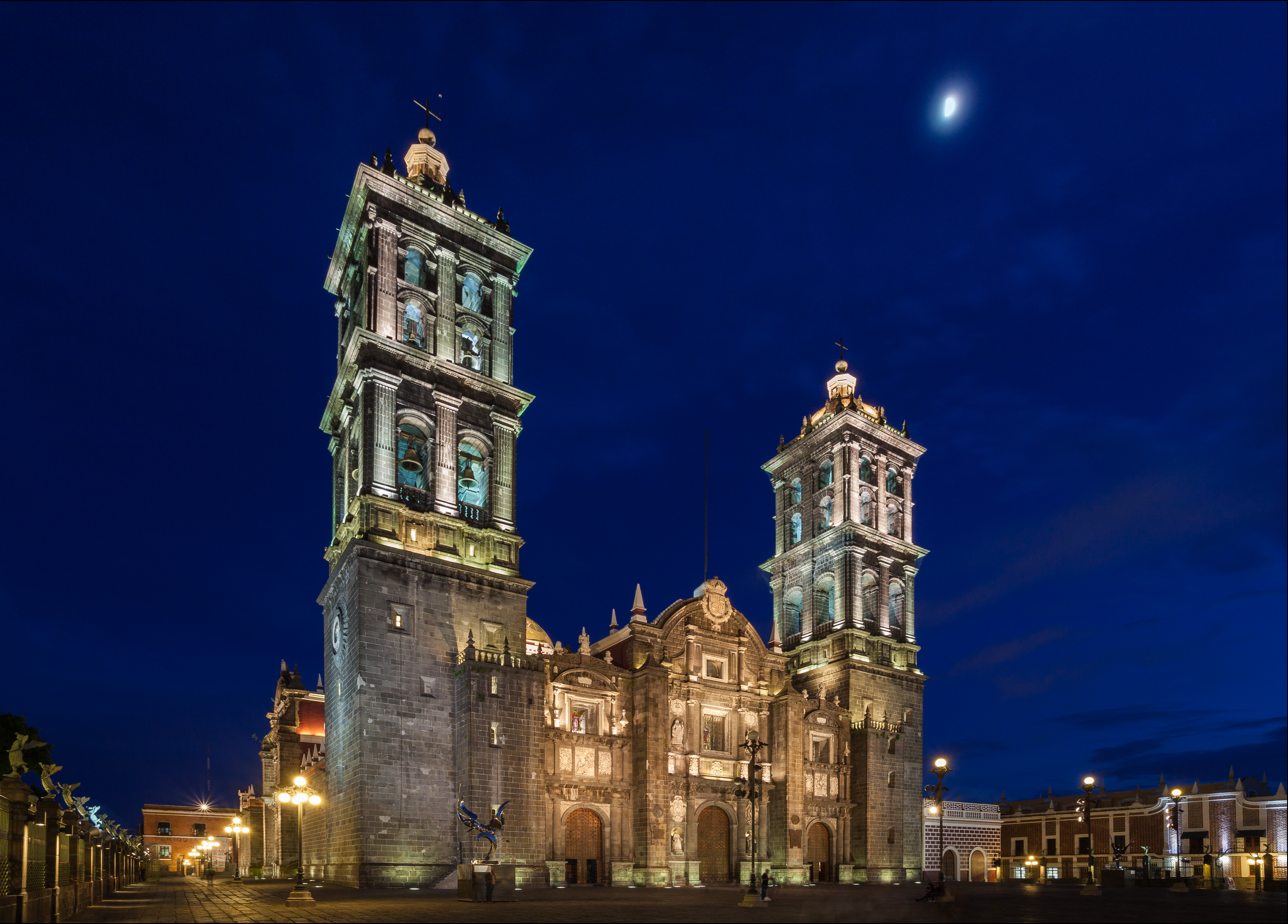
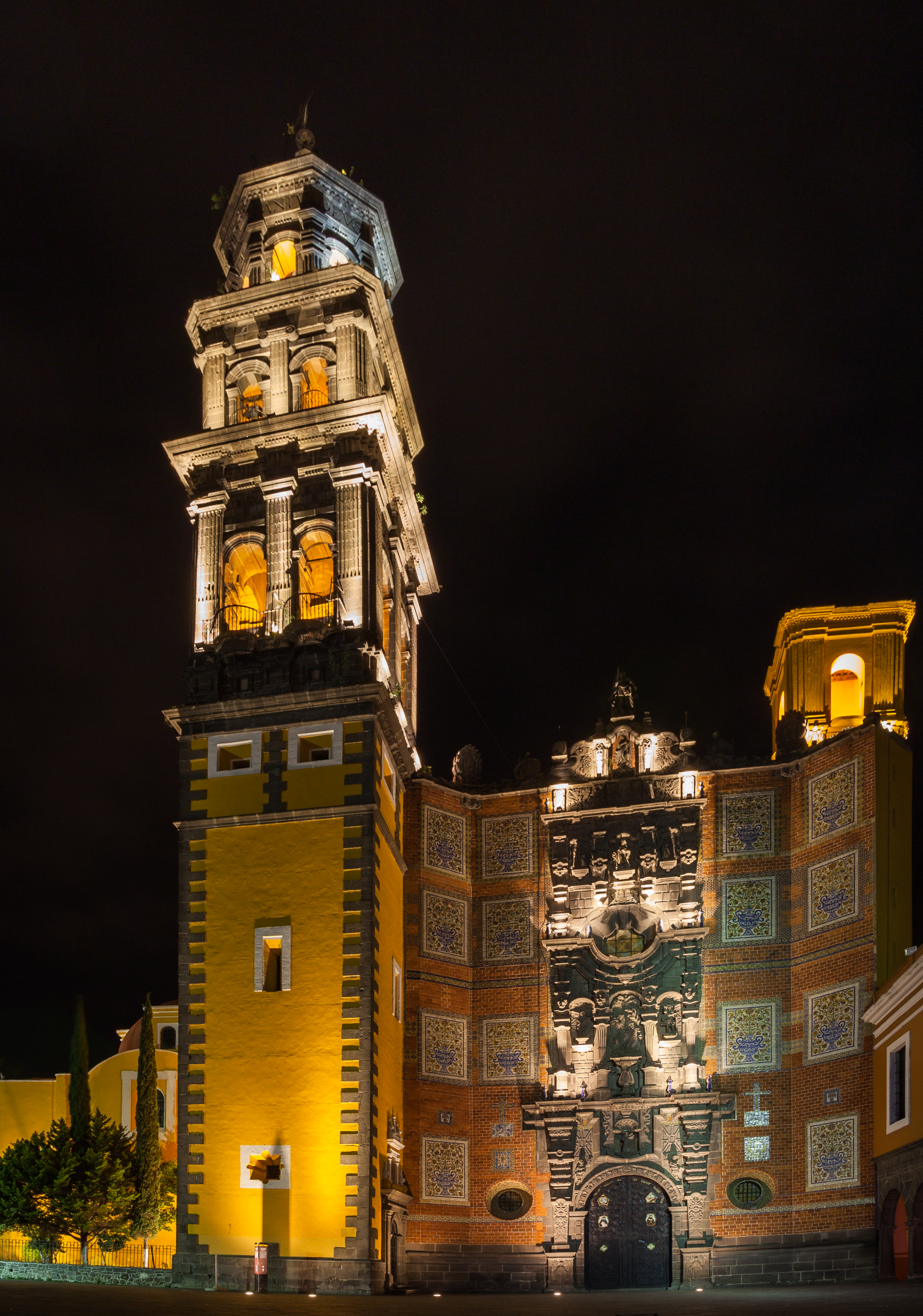
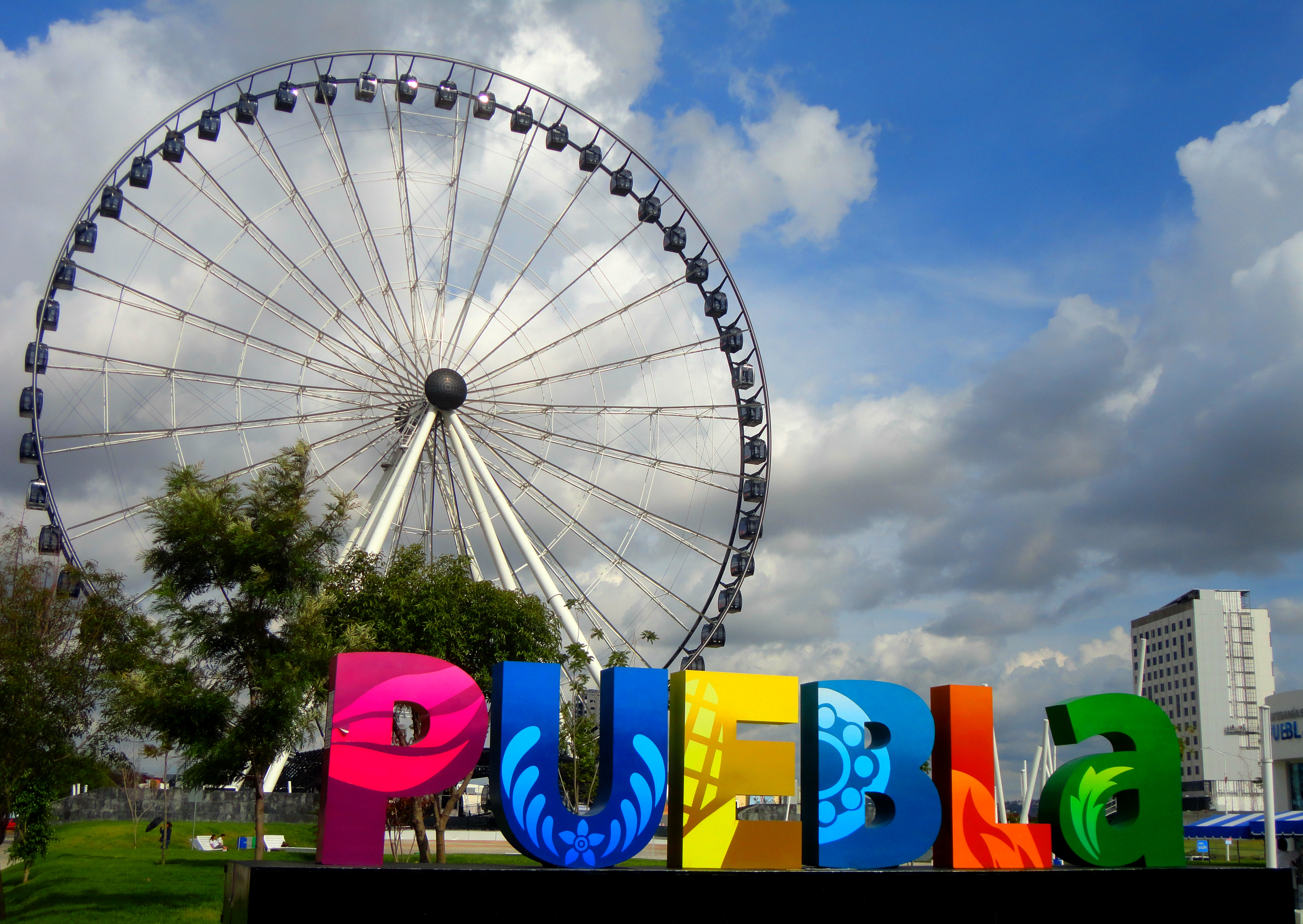
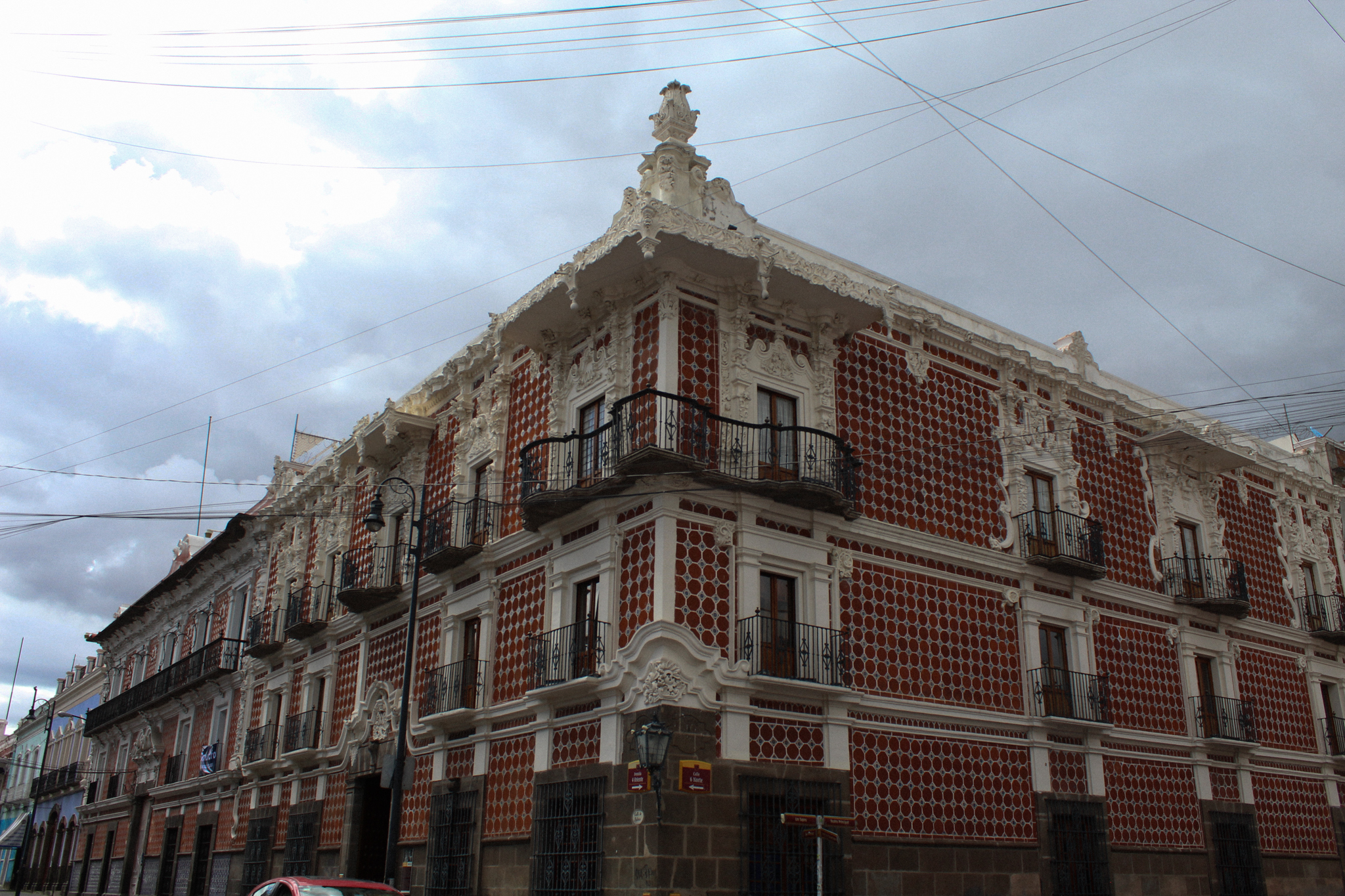
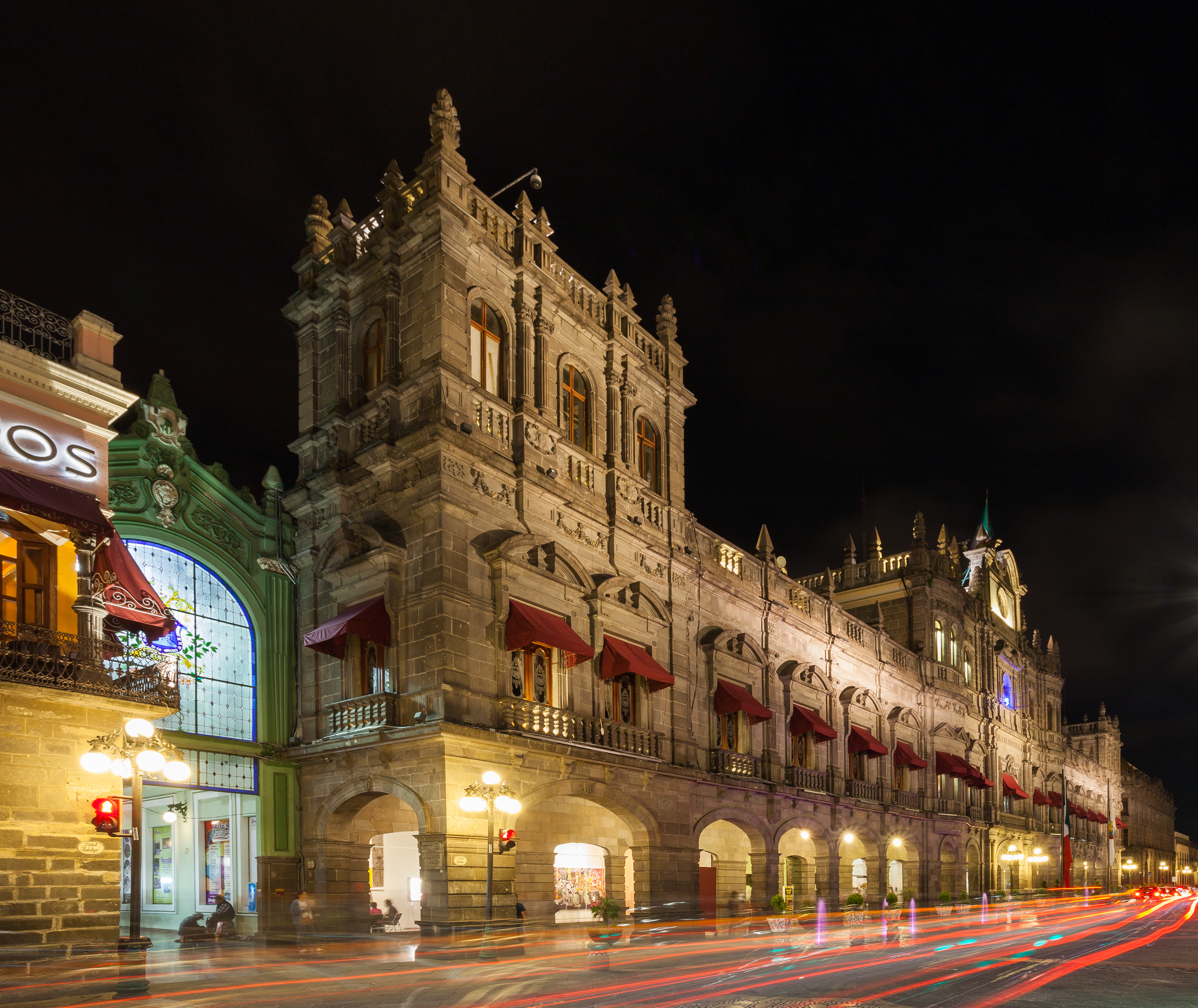
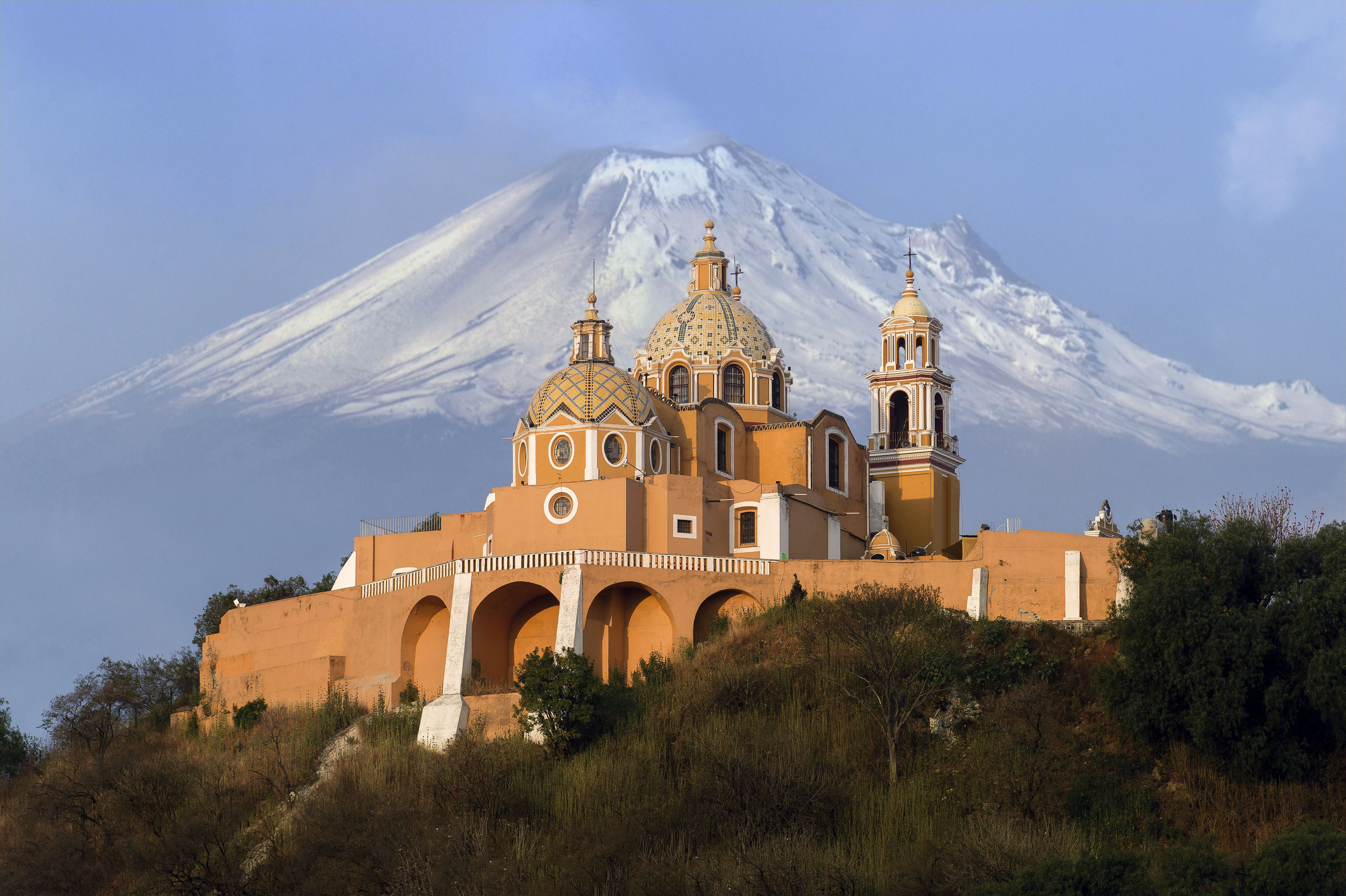
- Skyline of Puebla Cathedral of Puebla San Francisco church Estrella de Puebla Casa de Alfeñique Municipal Hall of Puebla Great Pyramid of Cholula and Popocatépetl (background)

- Flag Coat of arms
- Nicknames: The Reliquary of Americas, the City of Angels, The Angelopolis
- Location in Mexico Puebla (Mexico)
- Coordinates: 19°02′N 98°11′W
- Country: Mexico
- State: Puebla
- Municipality: Puebla
- Founded: 16 April 1531
- Municipal status: 1821

Government
  - Municipal President: José Chedraui Budib
  - Secretary: Francisco Rodríguez Álvarez

Area
  - City: 206 km^{2} (80 sq mi)
- Elevation (of seat): 2,135 m (7,005 ft)

Population (2020)
  - City: 1,542,232
  - Rank: 14th in North America; 5th in Mexico
  - Density: 7,490/km^{2} (19,400/sq mi)
  - Metro: 3,344,000
- Demonym(s): Poblano, Angelopolitano

GDP (PPP, constant 2015 values)
  - Year: 2025
  - Total: $78.5 billion
  - Per capita: $46,391
- Time zone: UTC−6 (Central)
- Postal code: 72000
- Area codes: 222, 221
- ISO 3166 code: MX-PUE
- Website: (in Spanish) Official site

UNESCO World Heritage Site
- Official name: Historic Centre of Puebla
- Type: Cultural
- Criteria: ii, iv
- Designated: 1987 (11th session)
- Reference no.: 416
- Region: Latin America and the Caribbean

Puebla de Zaragoza (Spanish pronunciation: [ˈpweβla]; Nahuatl languages: Cuetlaxcoapan; Mezquital Otomi: Nde'ma), formally Heroica Puebla de Zaragoza, formerly Puebla de los Ángeles during colonial times, or known simply as Puebla, is the seat of Puebla Municipality. It is the capital and largest city of the state of Puebla, and the fourth-largest city in Mexico, after Mexico City, Monterrey, and Guadalajara. A planned city from the viceregal era, it is located in the southern part of Central Mexico on the main route between Mexico City and Mexico's main Atlantic port, Veracruz—about 100 km (62 mi) east southeast of Mexico City and about 220 km (140 mi) west of Veracruz.

The city was founded in 1531 in an area called Cuetlaxcoapan, which means "where serpents change their skin", between two of the main indigenous settlements at the time, Tlaxcala and Cholula. This valley was not populated in the 16th century, as in the pre-Hispanic period this area was primarily used for the "flower wars" between a number of populations. Due to its history and architectural styles ranging from Renaissance to Mexican Baroque, the city was named a World Heritage Site in 1987. The city is also famous for mole poblano, chiles en nogada and Talavera pottery. However, most of its economy is based on industry.

Being both the fourth-largest city in Mexico and the fourth-largest metropolitan area in Mexico, it has a current population of 3,344,000 people, and the city serves as one of the main hubs for eastern-central Mexico. Students from surrounding states attend its prestigious universities, such as BUAP, UDLAP, Ibero, among others. The city also excels in industry, having the world's largest Volkswagen factory outside Germany, located in the Municipality of Cuautlancingo and an Audi plant in San José Chiapa. As a result, many suppliers to Volkswagen and Audi assembly plants have opened factories in the metropolitan area of Puebla.

== History ==
=== Pre-Columbian era ===
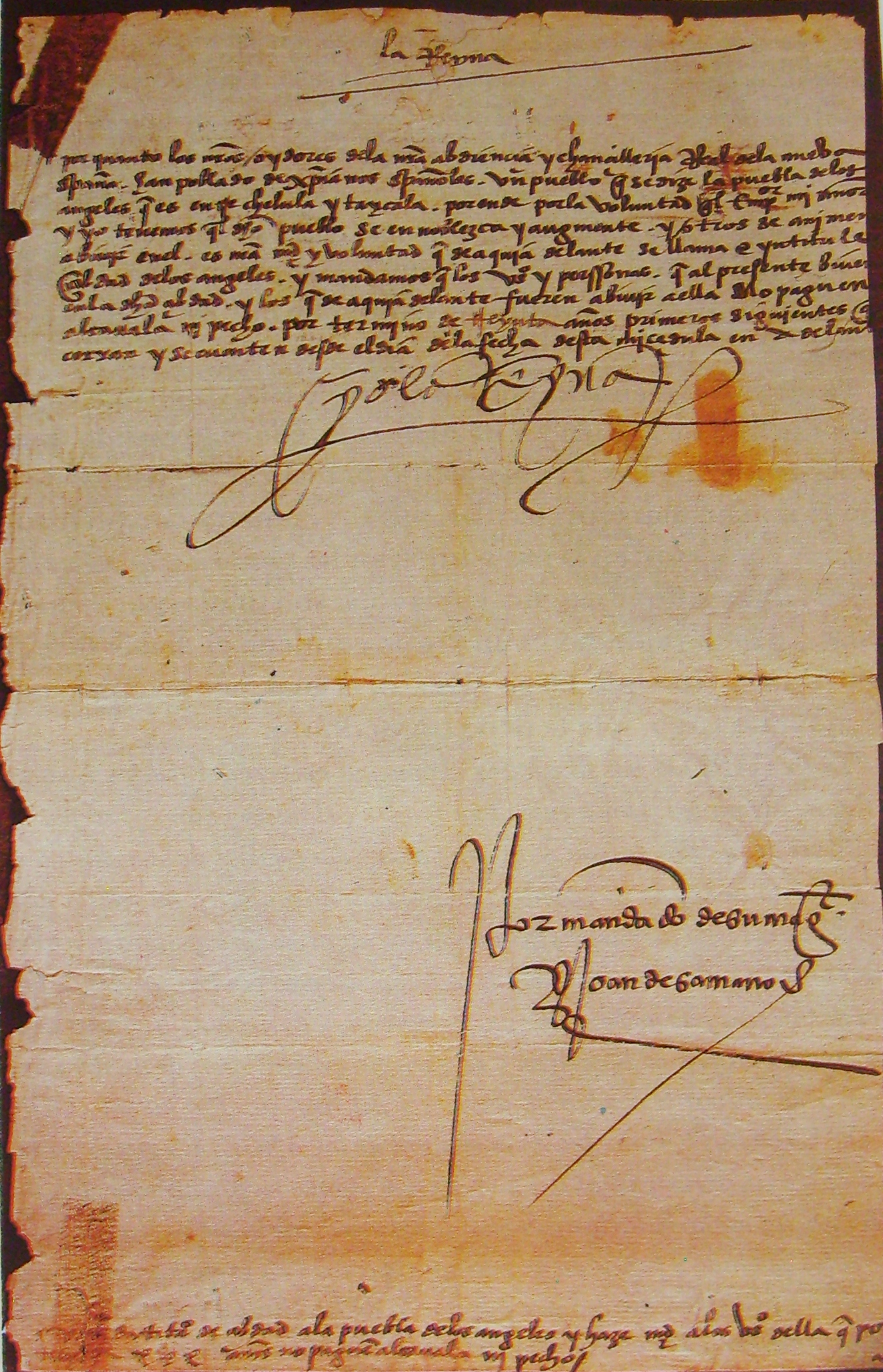
Writ to recognize Puebla as City signed by Spain's queen Isabella of Portugal, municipal archive

Some historians consider that the area where the city is located nowadays was not inhabited in the Pre-Columbian era, except in the 15th century, when this valley was set aside for use for the so-called Flower wars among the populations of Itzocan, Tepeaca, Huejotzingo, Texmelucan and Tlaxcala, with those soldiers captured being used as sacrifice victims.

The foundation of Puebla begins with a letter from the bishop of Tlaxcala in 1530, Julián Garcés, to the Spanish queen outlining the need for a Spanish settlement between Mexico City and the port of Veracruz. According to legend, the bishop had a dream about where to build the city. In this dream, he saw a valley with woods and meadows crossed by a clear river and dotted with fresh-water springs on fertile land. While he was contemplating this scenery, he supposedly saw a group of angels descend from heaven and trace out the city. Convinced he had seen a divine vision, he celebrated Mass, and took some of the brothers out in search of the place. Five leagues from the monastery he declared they had found the place shown in the dream. This legend is the source of Puebla's original name, Puebla de los Ángeles, and its current nickname Angelópolis (literally, City of Angels).

=== Coat of arms ===
The city's coat of arms refers to a city (the castle with 5 towers) which is protected by angels; the letters K. V. refer to Charles V, Holy Roman Emperor (Latin: Karolus V), also referred to as Charles I of Spain; below are 7 rivers which cross the city.

=== Colonial era ===
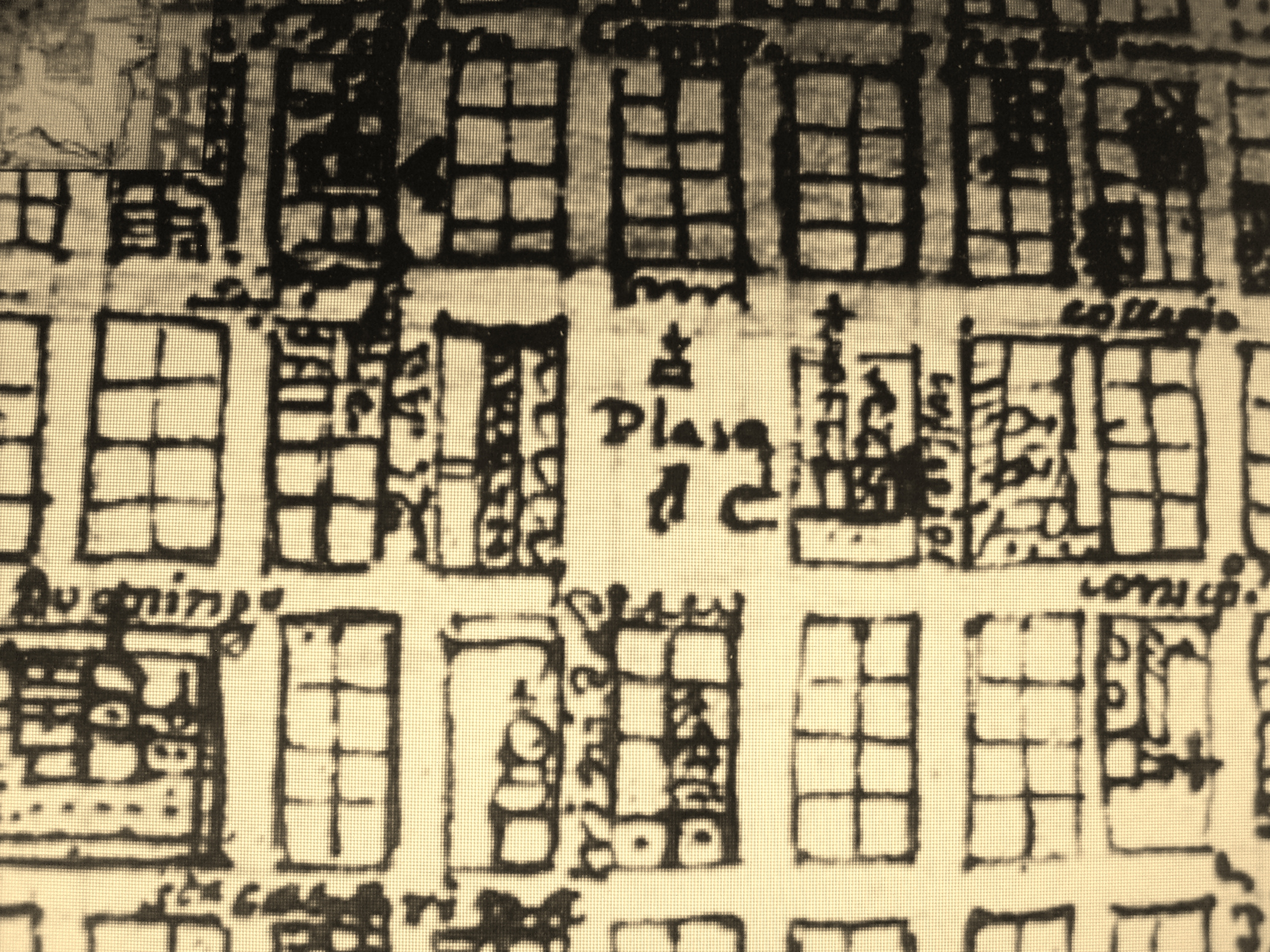
1698 map of the city

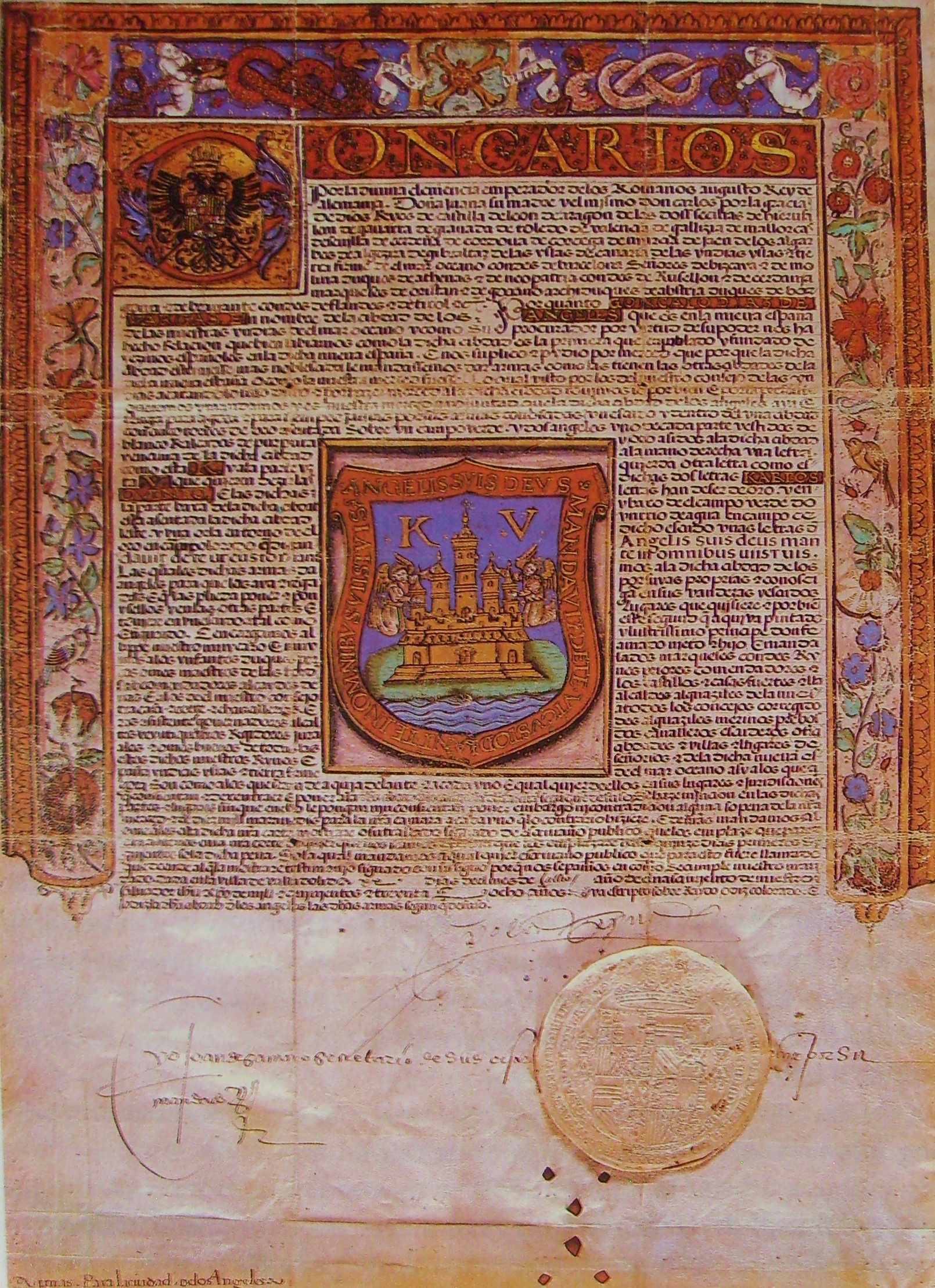
Cédula Real which grants the colonial coat of arms to the city of Puebla de los Angeles and which was granted by Charles V, Holy Roman Emperor in the city of Valladolid on July 20, 1538.

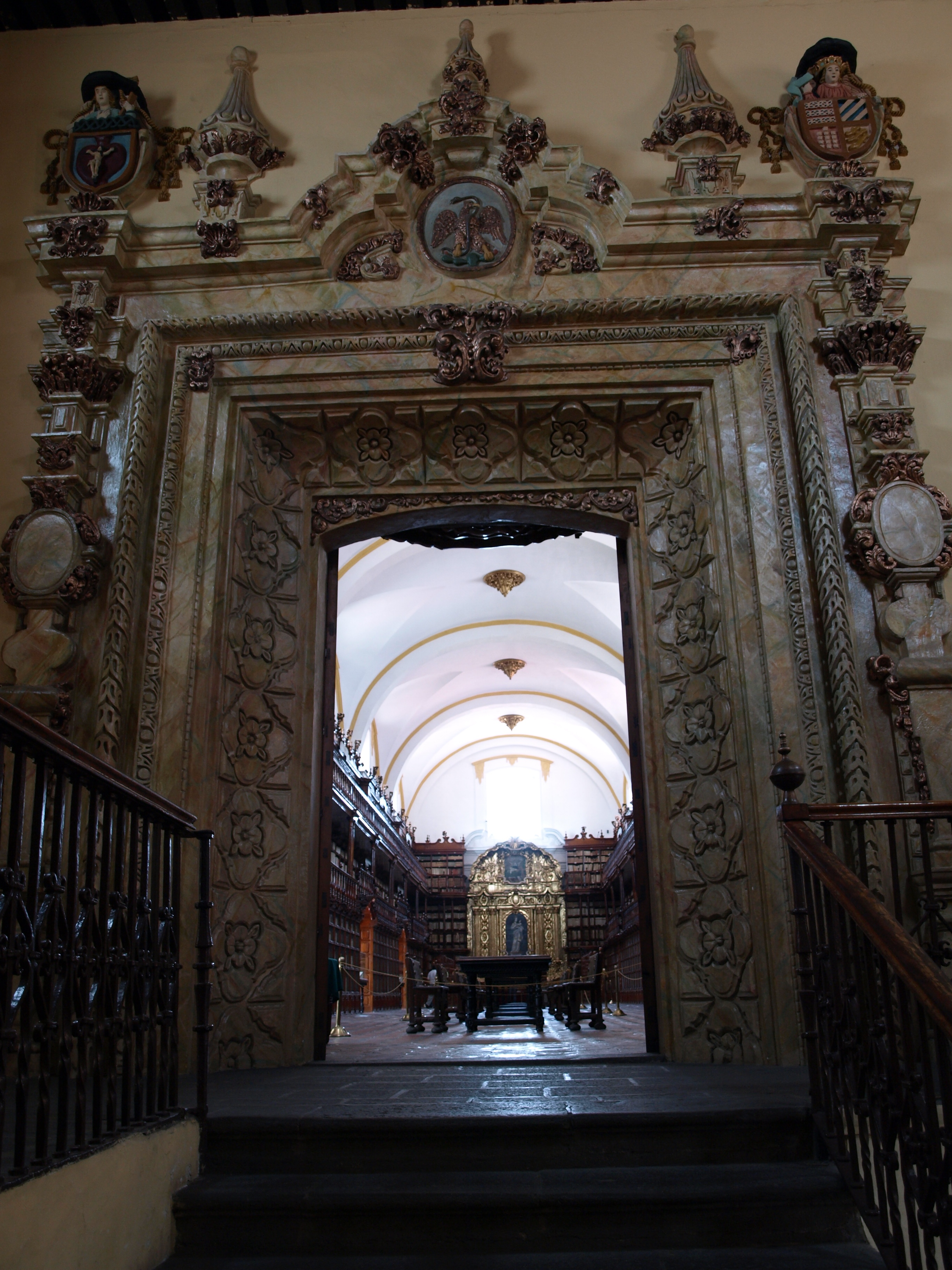
The Biblioteca Palafoxiana, founded by priest Juan de Palafox y Mendoza in 1646, is recognized by UNESCO for being the first public library in the Americas.

The city was founded in 1531 within the Valley of Cuetlaxcoapan as a Spanish city, not on the foundation of an existing indigenous city-state. The official date of foundation is 16 April 1531, however, this first attempt at settlement failed due to constant flooding of the site right next to the river. Several rivers flow through the Valley of Puebla, the San Francisco, Atoyac and the Alseseca. This valley was bordered by the indigenous city-states turned colonial towns of Cholula, Tlaxcala, Huejotzingo and Tepeaca, all of which had large indigenous populations. After the city's foundation, this valley became the main route between Mexico City and Veracruz, the port on the Caribbean coast and the connection to Spain.

Puebla was an important city and region in the history of New Spain, since it was in the center region of Spanish settlement, midway between the main port and the capital, had a large indigenous population, and drew many Spanish settlers. It supplied the capital with commercially grown agricultural products and became a center of local textile production. It was well connected to Mexico's North, particularly the silver-mining region around Zacatecas.

Most of the population moved away from the west bank of the San Francisco River to a higher site. A few families remained behind and renamed the original settlement Alto de San Francisco. The Spanish Crown supported the founding of Puebla as a city without encomiendas, as this system was being abused and a number of Spaniards were finding themselves landless. Puebla received its coat-of-arms in 1538, and the titles "Noble y Leal" (Noble and Loyal) in 1558, "Muy Noble y Leal Ciudad" (Very Noble and Loyal City) in 1561 and "Muy Noble y Muy Leal Ciudad" (Very Noble and Very Loyal City) in 1576.

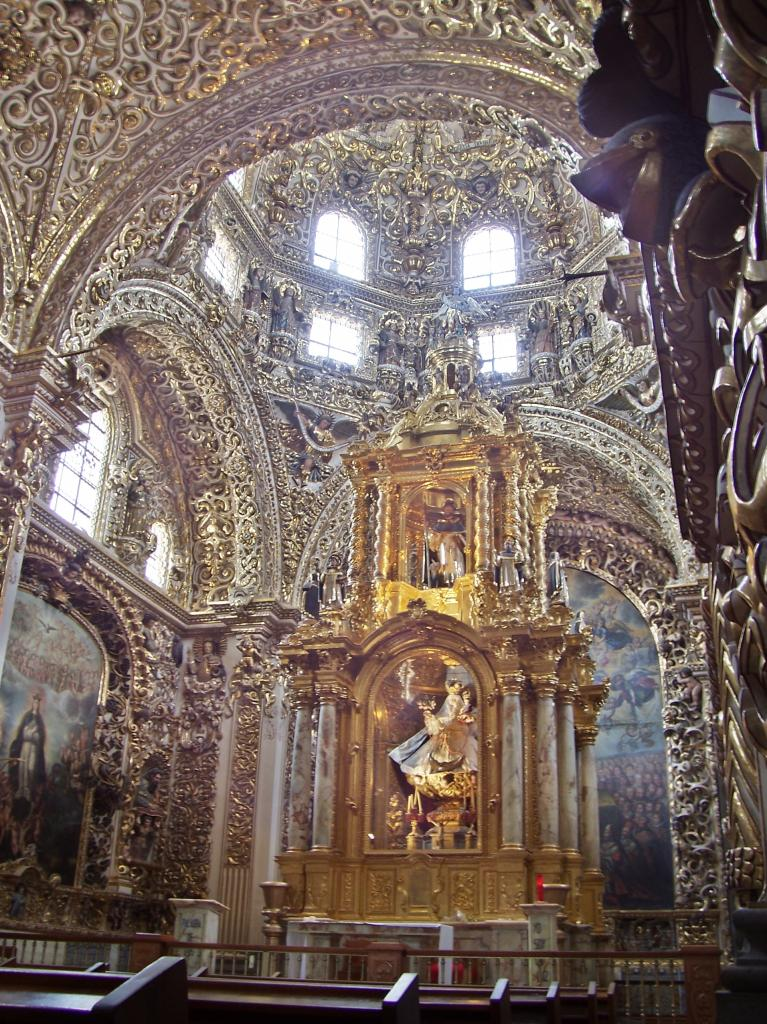
Chapel of the Rosario, a masterpiece of Mexican Baroque and once known as the "Eighth Wonder of the World".

The layout of the city is of classic Spanish design, centered on a main plaza, today called the Zócalo. This main plaza originally was rectangular, but later made square because the earlier version was considered to be ugly. Another major feature of the city were the weekly markets (tianguis), in which indigenous sellers would come with their wares and foodstuffs to sell to the population. By the mid-16th century, water was brought in to the main plaza to a newly installed fountain. By the end of the century, the city occupied 120 blocks, much of which was under construction, with the new Cathedral begun in 1575. During the Union of Spain and Portugal (1580–1640), the city developed a sizeable Portuguese community. Trade ties with Portugal and a growing economy made the city an entrepôt for the transatlantic slave trade during the early 1600s.

Puebla's favorable climate and strategic location helped the city to prosper, quickly becoming the second most important city in New Spain. Juan Gutiérrez de Padilla, the preeminent 17th-century composer in the New World, spent most of his life at the cathedral, from about 1620 to 1664.

The city council of Puebla, being made up of only Spaniards, had a certain amount of autonomy in the politics of the city and the land under its jurisdiction. This council annexed the towns of Amozoc, Totimehuacán, and Cuautinchán to its territory in 1755. By 1786, Puebla's lands reached from what is now Veracruz to Guerrero states. The city continued to grow and be more regulated during the 17th and 18th centuries. A new city hall was built in 1714 and the tianguis in the main plaza was replaced by wood stalls by the 1770s. The streets were paved with stone between 1786 and 1811.

Commercial activity was dislodged from the main plaza completely by the early 19th century and placed in the San Francisco Parian market. Other plazas, such as the San Luis, San Antonio, El Carmen, La Concordia and Santa Inés were built. The main plaza underwent several transformations, adding statues and gardens. During the Mexican War of Independence, Puebla's main role was the printing and distribution of the plan for independence. In 1827, after Independence, all Spaniards (peninsulares) were expelled from the city's lands.

=== Early Republican era ===
In 1847, the city was taken by U.S. forces under General Winfield Scott, without a shot fired. The American garrison was besieged in the city from 14 September – 12 October 1847 by the irregular forces of General Joaquín Rea and later reinforced by Antonio López de Santa Anna. The siege was broken by the force of General Joseph Lane that fought its way from Veracruz into the city after defeating Santa Ana in the Battle of Huamantla on 9 October 1847. Puebla was then the base for General Lane's campaign against General Rea and the other guerrillas that harassed the U. S. Army line of communications. These forces left in July 1848 after the Treaty of Guadalupe Hidalgo was ratified.

During the French intervention in Mexico on 5 May 1862 in the Battle of Puebla, defending Mexican forces under Ignacio Zaragoza defeated the French army under Count de Lorencez. The city's name was changed to Puebla de Zaragoza in 1862, by a decree issued by Benito Juárez and the holiday "5 de Mayo" (Cinco de Mayo) is a major annual event here. The city was attacked again by the French in 1863, who succeeded in taking it. French forces left in 1866 and reconstruction began in 1867.

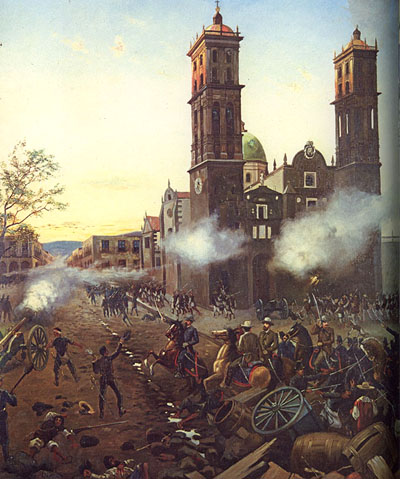
Image from the Battle of Puebla in the city center in 1863.

During the end of the 19th and beginning of the 20th century, Puebla remained important culturally and economically. It had a thriving textile industry at this time. Immigration from Europe was encouraged and people from Spain, Italy, Germany, France and Lebanon came to live in the city.

In what became a precursor to the Mexican Revolution, siblings Carmen, Máximo y Aquiles Serdán were behind one of the first conspiracies against the Porfirio Diaz government. Their plans were discovered and their house, located on 6 Oriente street was surrounded by federal troops. A gun battle ensued, killing both Serdán brothers on 18 November 1910. During the Mexican Revolution, the city was taken by forces under General Pablo Gonzalez Garza, then later was under Zapatista control.

=== Recent events ===
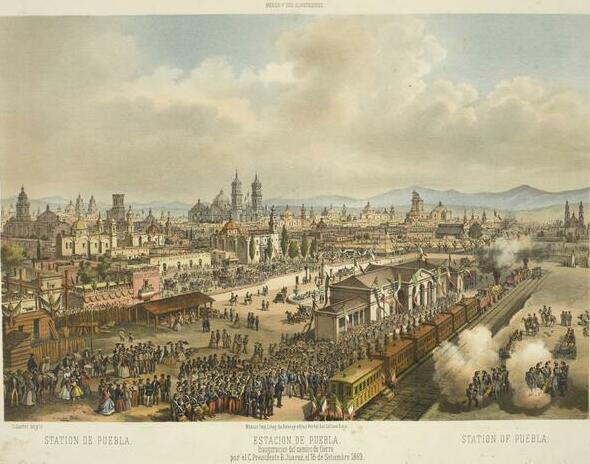
Puebla City in 1869. Lithograph of the new railway station.

From 1931 until the end of the 20th century, growth of the city spurred the absorption of the municipalities of Ignacio Mariscal, San Felipe Hueyotlipan, Resurreccion, San Jeronimo Caleras, San Miguel Canoa and San Francisco Totimehuacán into the city. In 1950, by decree of the state congress, the city received the title of Heroica Puebla de Zaragoza. In 1977, the federal government declared the city a Zone of Historical Monuments. In 1987, the historic centre of Puebla was declared a World Heritage Site by UNESCO.

The City of Puebla submitted its candidacy to hold the headquarters of the Free Trade Area of the Americas, and briefly served as interim secretariat headquarters until negotiations were stopped in 2005.

== Municipality ==
The municipality is located in the west-central region of the State of Puebla, bordering the municipalities of Santo Domingo Huehutlán, San Andrés Cholula, Teopantlán, Amozoc, Cuauthinchán, Tzicatlacoyan, Cuautlancingo, and Ocoyucan, and the State of Tlaxcala.

As municipal seat, the city of Puebla is the government for 482 other communities with a total area of 534.32 km^{2}. However, 94% of the municipality's population of 1,485,941 lives in the city proper.

=== Environment ===
Most of the municipality has been deforested, including the lower portions of the Malinche volcano and all the Sierra de Amozoc, due to logging and seasonal farming.

The Sierra del Tentzon and higher elevations of Malinche volcano still conserve the Trans-Mexican Volcanic Belt pine-oak forests ecoregion – with forests of pine, holm oak and other tree species. In the pine forests, Montezuma Pine (Pinus montezumae) is generally predominant, with Hartweg's Pine (Pinus hartwegii) and Pinus teocote in dry areas with shallow soils. Pine-fir forests are composed almost entirely of Hartweg's Pine (Pinus hartwegii) and Sacred Fir (Abies religiosa).

Animal life consists mostly of small mammals such as rabbits and skunks, as well as birds such as owls, buzzards and wild waterfowl.

== Geography ==
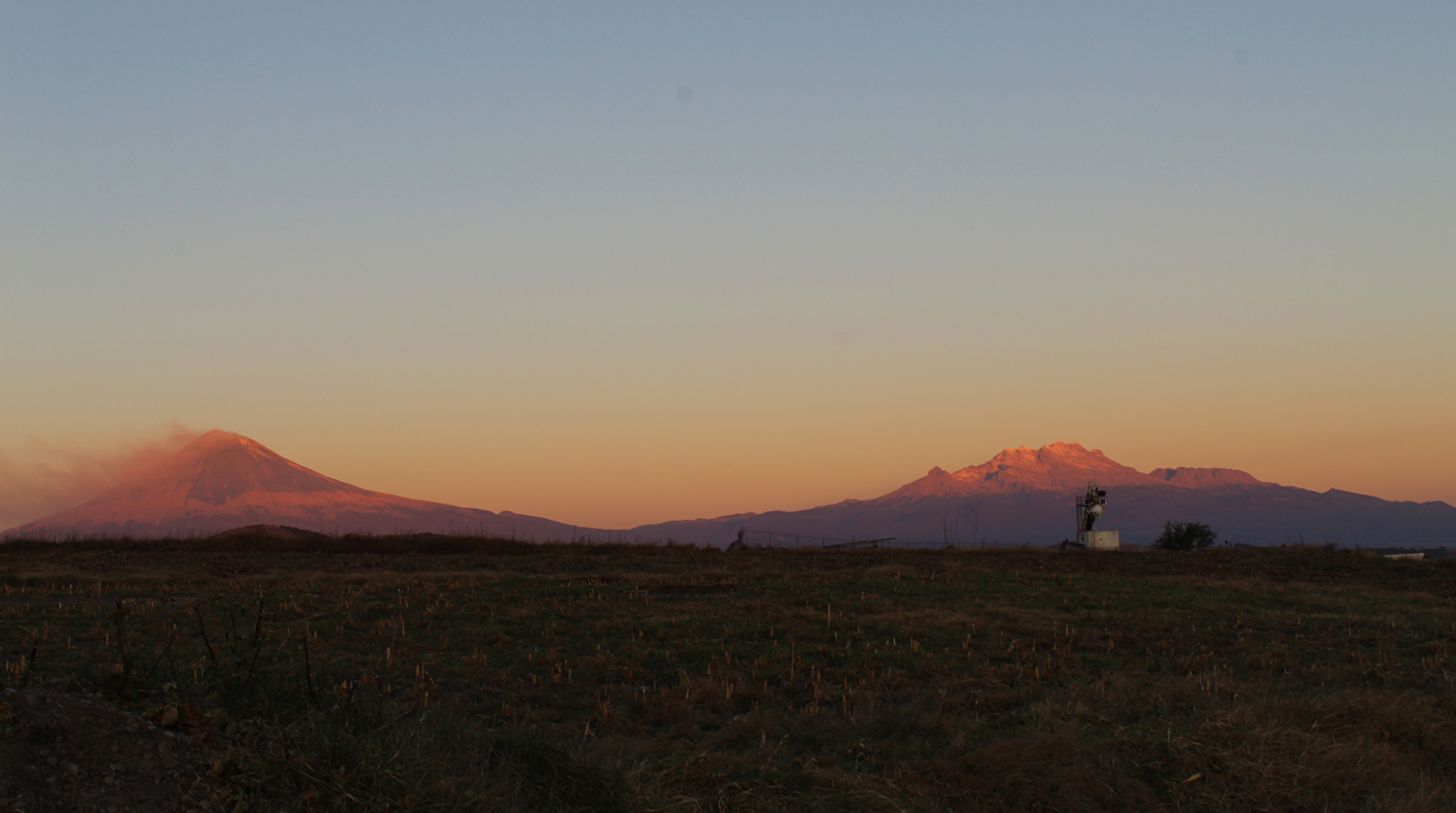
Popocatépetl alongside Iztaccíhuatl

Puebla is located at the Valley of Puebla also known as the Valley of Cuetlaxcoapan, a large valley surrounded on four sides by the mountains and volcanoes of the Trans-Mexican Volcanic Belt. It is located 40 kilometres (25 miles) east of the Popocatépetl and Iztaccíhuatl volcanoes, giving residents views of their snow-topped peaks. Due to the proximity to the Popocatépetl, Puebla is sometimes exposed to the ash and dust that emanate from the volcano during its active periods, the most recent occurring on 19 May 2023.

La Malinche dormant volcano is located to the north of the city, and the Pico de Orizaba to the east. Hydrologically, the city is part of the Atoyac river basin; the river runs through northern, eastern and southern portions of the municipality, and connects to the Lake of Valsequillo, where the Manuel Ávila Camacho dam has been built. Other rivers that cross the area are the Alseseca and San Francisco.

== Climate ==
Under the Köppen climate classification (Köppen: Cwb), Puebla features a subtropical highland climate, due to its tropical location but high altitude of around 2,100 m (6,889.76 ft). In Mexico, the official designation is "subhumid temperate climate with summer rains". It rarely gets truly hot in Puebla, with an average of only three days seeing temperatures rise above 29 °C (84 °F). Night temperatures are cool at all times of the year. Puebla experiences dry, temperate winter months (mid-October through February), warm springs (March to mid-May), and a monsoon season from mid-May to mid-October.

Climate data for Puebla, Mexico (1991–2020)
Month	Jan	Feb	Mar	Apr	May	Jun	Jul	Aug	Sep	Oct	Nov	Dec	Year
Record high °C (°F)	29.5 (85.1)	33.0 (91.4)	36.0 (96.8)	36.0 (96.8)	36.5 (97.7)	34.0 (93.2)	33.0 (91.4)	33.0 (91.4)	32.0 (89.6)	33.0 (91.4)	33.0 (91.4)	33.0 (91.4)	36.5 (97.7)
Mean daily maximum °C (°F)	23.0 (73.4)	24.9 (76.8)	26.9 (80.4)	28.4 (83.1)	28.5 (83.3)	26.5 (79.7)	26.0 (78.8)	26.1 (79.0)	25.0 (77.0)	25.2 (77.4)	24.5 (76.1)	23.5 (74.3)	25.7 (78.3)
Daily mean °C (°F)	14.2 (57.6)	15.9 (60.6)	17.8 (64.0)	19.7 (67.5)	20.4 (68.7)	19.6 (67.3)	19.0 (66.2)	19.1 (66.4)	18.5 (65.3)	17.7 (63.9)	16.2 (61.2)	14.7 (58.5)	17.7 (63.9)
Mean daily minimum °C (°F)	5.3 (41.5)	6.8 (44.2)	8.8 (47.8)	11.0 (51.8)	12.2 (54.0)	12.8 (55.0)	11.9 (53.4)	12.0 (53.6)	11.9 (53.4)	10.3 (50.5)	7.9 (46.2)	5.9 (42.6)	9.7 (49.5)
Record low °C (°F)	−5.5 (22.1)	−1.5 (29.3)	−2.0 (28.4)	1.0 (33.8)	5.0 (41.0)	5.0 (41.0)	4.0 (39.2)	4.5 (40.1)	0.0 (32.0)	2.0 (35.6)	−4.5 (23.9)	−6.0 (21.2)	−6.0 (21.2)
Average precipitation mm (inches)	9.8 (0.39)	7.5 (0.30)	13.9 (0.55)	28.7 (1.13)	91.0 (3.58)	202.2 (7.96)	174.7 (6.88)	191.3 (7.53)	213.5 (8.41)	82.4 (3.24)	25.7 (1.01)	4.2 (0.17)	1,044.9 (41.14)
Average rainy days	2.4	1.9	4.1	7.5	14.9	20.2	18.1	20.0	21.2	12.2	4.0	1.1	127.6
Average relative humidity (%)	53	53	47	52	55	63	67	68	65	62	52	60	58
Mean monthly sunshine hours	263	280	285	266	245	200	212	202	183	228	259	253	2,876
Source 1: Servicio Meteorológico National (humidity 1981–2000)
Source 2: Ogimet (sun 1981–2010)

== Cultural attractions and tourism ==
=== Parks, squares and districts ===
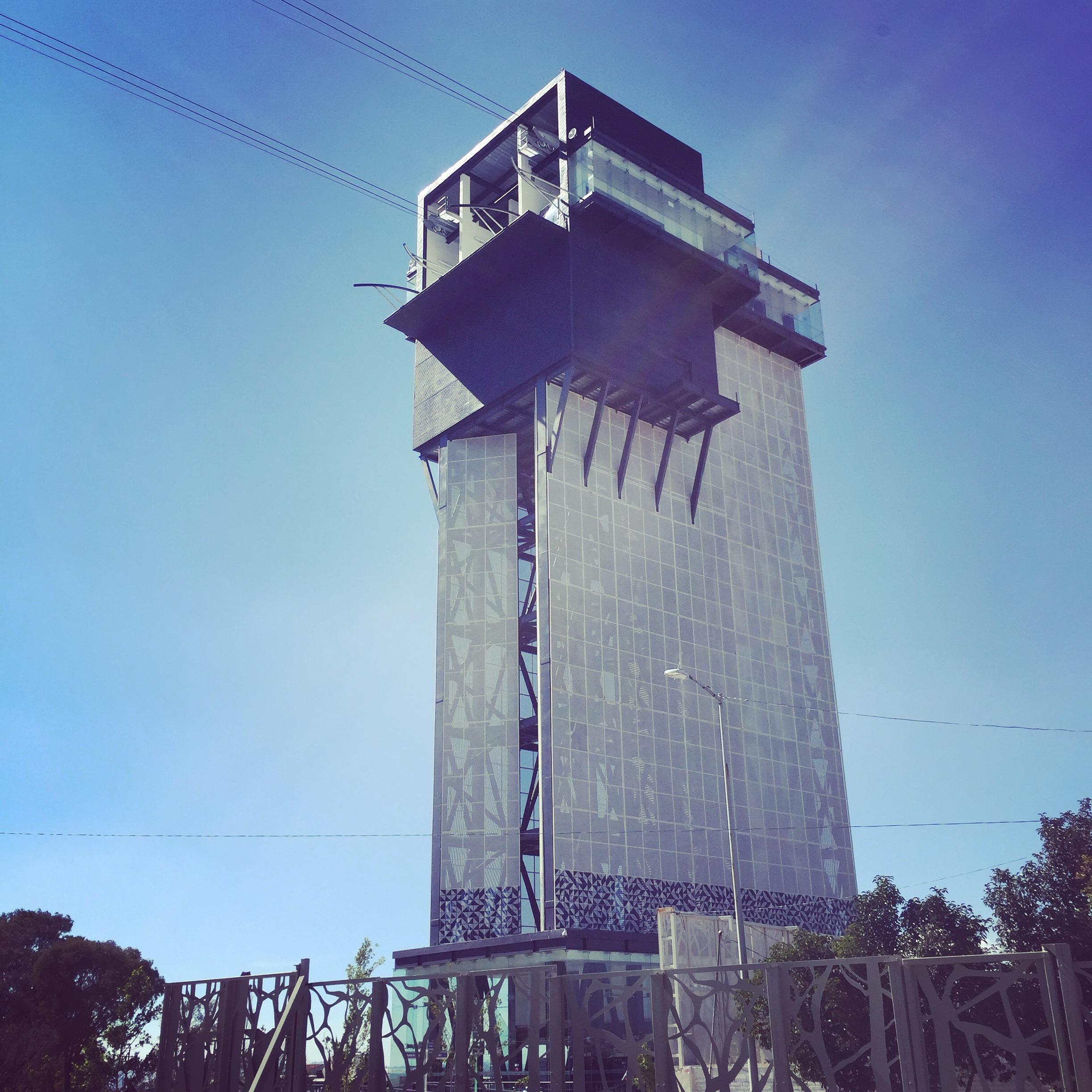
The cable car

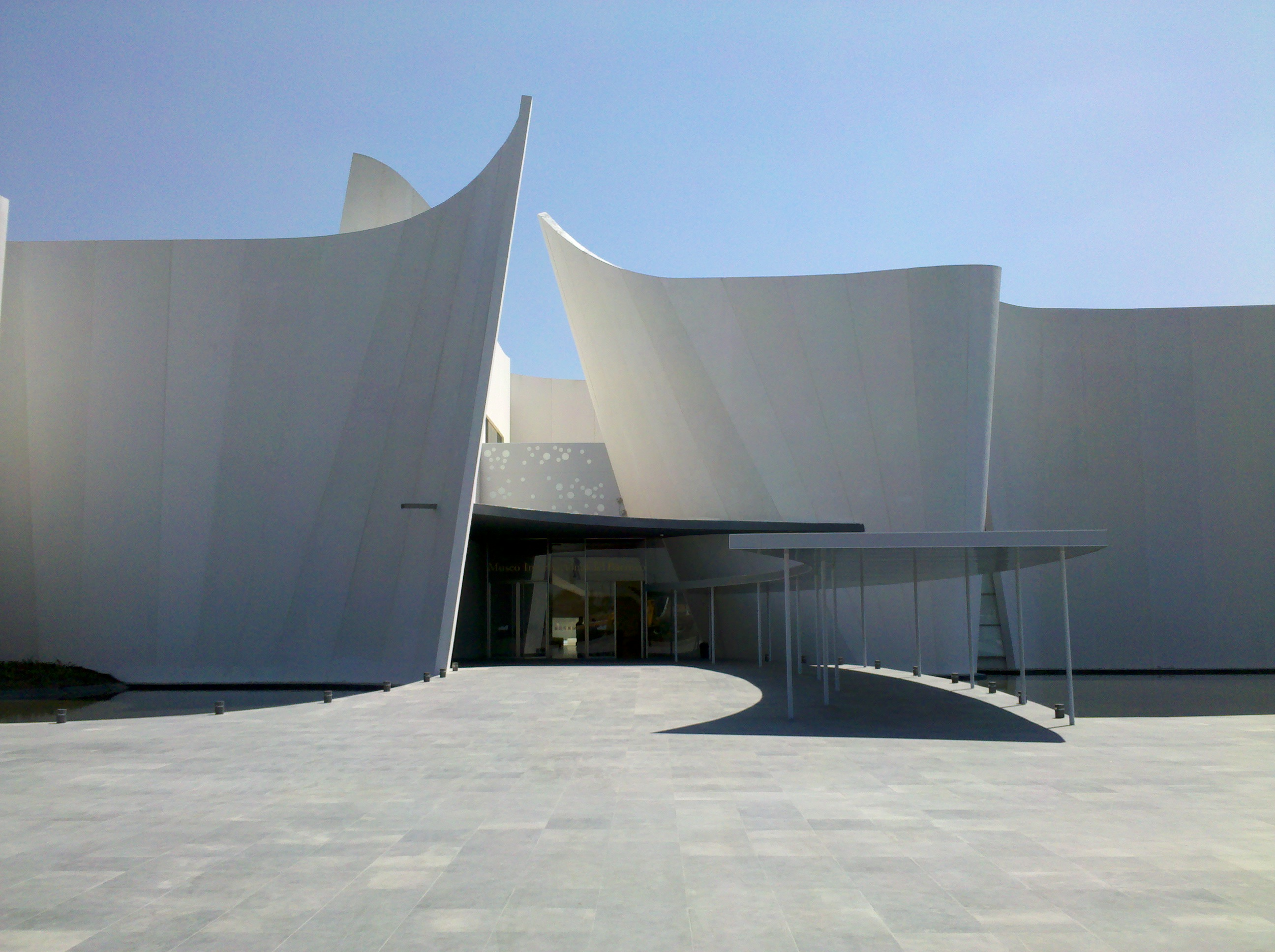
International Museum of the Baroque

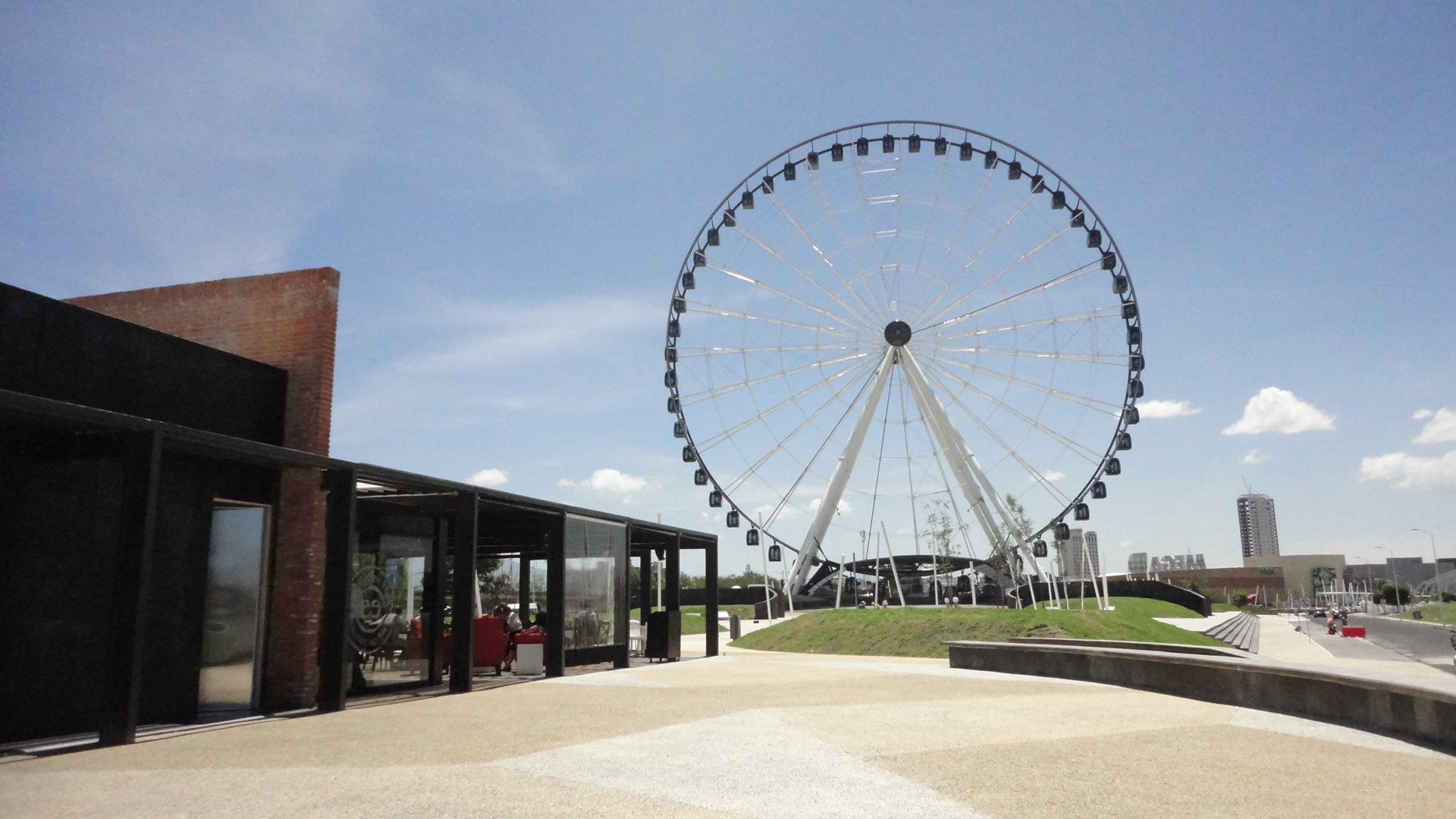
Cafe at Parque Lineal

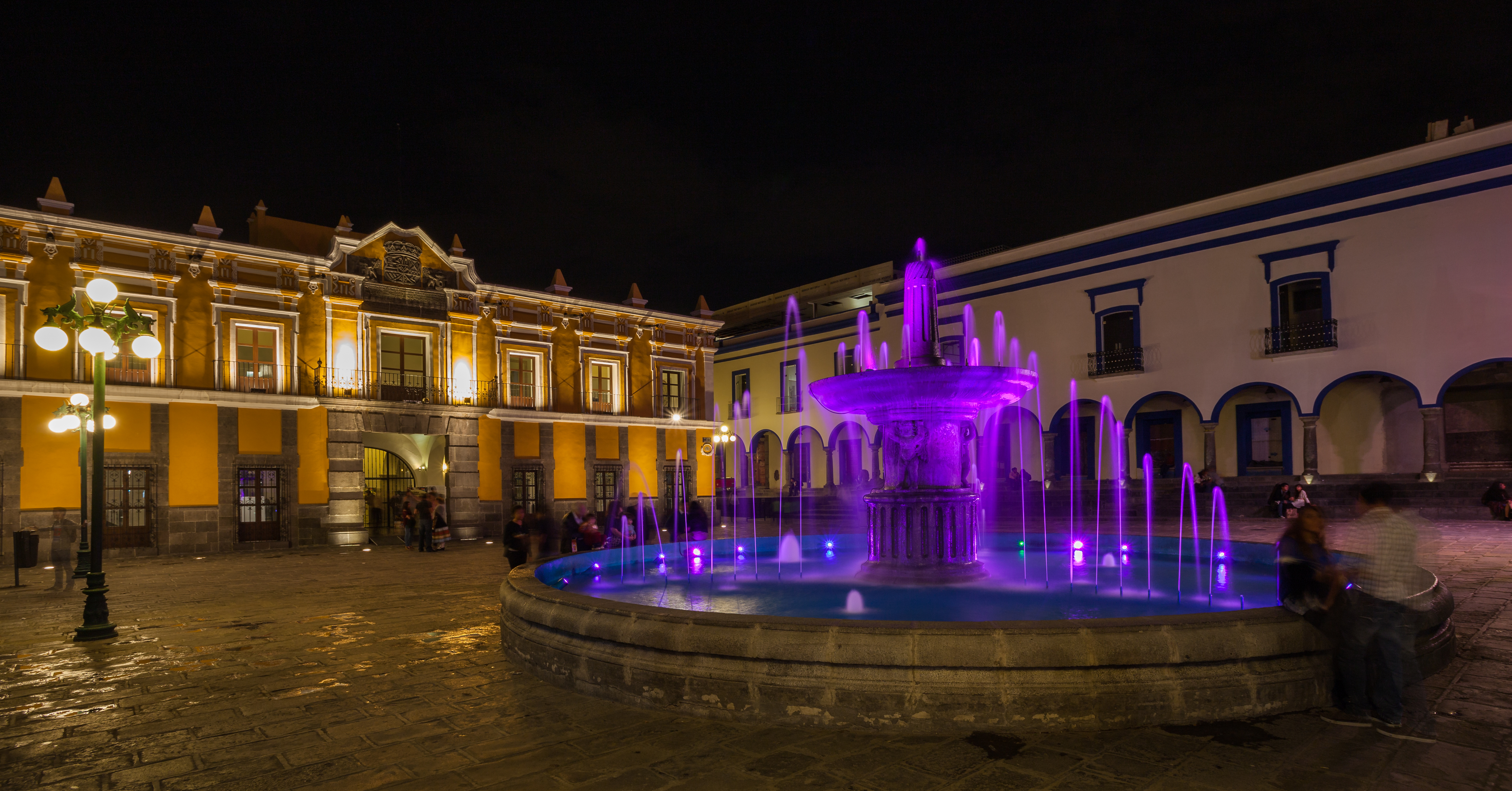
Main Theatre

Parque del Arte

The historical and cultural value of Puebla's architecture is a major reason the city was chosen as a UNESCO World Heritage Site. In addition, UNESCO recognizes Puebla as a "Design City". Various architectural styles and techniques such as Baroque, Renaissance and Classic are represented here in over 5,000 buildings in the city. The historic centre is filled with churches, monasteries, mansions and the like, mostly done in gray cantera stone, red brick and decorated with multicolored tiles. Puebla is also considered to be the "cradle of Mexican Baroque" both in architecture and in the decorative arts, and one of the five most important colonial cities in Mexico.

In spite of the many shopping malls that exist in Puebla today, the Zócalo, the main square, remains the cultural, political and religious center of the city. Many notable buildings surround the Zocalo including City Hall, the Casa de los Muñecos and the cathedral. Most of the streets in Puebla are named on a numbering system, which centers on the northwest corner of the Zocalo. El Parián is an arts and crafts market, within walking distance of the plaza. It consists mostly of permanent stalls but there is an area provided for vendors who visit and sell their wares on blankets spread on the ground.

Popular parks in Puebla include Parque Ecologico, Parque del Arte, and Laguna San Baltazar.

Cuexcomate is a geyser cone thirteen meters tall with a diameter of 23 meters. The geyser is inactive and located in the La Libertad neighborhood of the city of Puebla. There is a spiral staircase going down into the crater itself.

Cuexcomate was mistakenly called the smallest volcano in the world due to its shape. However, this is a geyser, not a volcano. The word Cuexcomate comes from the Nahuatl "clay pot" or "place to keep" and has been used to store meals and dispose of dead bodies.

=== Museums and galleries ===
The Amparo Museum is housed in two colonial-era buildings from the 17th and 18th centuries that were popularly known as El Hospitalito. One was the Hospital of San Juan de Letrán, which was converted into a college for women. The other is a mansion from the 18th century. It was joined to the hospital and then became the "Deposito de Mujeres Casadas" (Refuge of Married Women) This was established in 1606 for women whose husbands were gone for long periods of time. However, the idea was not popular with women and in 1609, it became the asylum for "lost women," those obligated to be secluded for some reason. This facility was moved to another building and the building became part of the women's college founded next door, then a convent. The museum has fourteen exhibition halls with pottery, steles and sculptures from the Zapotec, Huasteca, Maya, Olmec and Aztec cultures as well as fine furniture and religious objects from the colonial period and examples of contemporary art. These represent the three epochs of Mexican history, pre-Columbian, colonial-era and post-Independence. Seven of the halls are dedicated to pre-Columbian pieces.

The Biblioteca Palafoxiana (Palafoxiana Library) was established in 1646 by Juan de Palafox y Mendoza for the Seminary of Puebla. He donated his own collection of 5,000 books to the College of San Juan to start the collection. It was the first public library in the Americas. The main room is in Baroque style and was constructed in 1773 by Bishop Francisco Fabian y Fuero who also named the institution after Palafox. Today the library contains over 42,000 books, 5,000 manuscripts and other items, which date from 1473 to 1910. The Library was named a Historic Monument of Mexico (Monumento Histórico de México) and UNESCO has made it a world heritage site.

The Centro Cultural Santa Rosa is housed in a building that dates from the 17th century which originally was housing for Dominican nuns. Later, it became a convent named in honour of Saint Rose of Lima. This is where the story of the invention of mole poblano takes place. In 1869, it ceased being a convent and became a psychiatric hospital. In the 20th century the Ceramic Museum was founded in the building's kitchen, with the rest of the building occupied as tenements for about 1500 people. In 1973, the Museo de Arte Cultural Poblano was founded and in 2000 the name was changed to the current one. The facility offers exhibitions, shows and art classes.

The Museo de la Revolución (Museum of the Revolution) was the home of Aquiles Serdán in the very early 20th century. He was politically active in the anti-reelection (of President Porfirio Diaz) movement of the time and was accused of distributing propaganda against Díaz. Police assaulted the building and Serdán and his family fought back, until Aquiles was killed. President Francisco I. Madero stayed at the home in honor of Serdán. Shortly thereafter, the family moved to Mexico City and the building became tenements and stores. Decades later, the federal government acquired the building from the family to convert it into the museum that is here today.

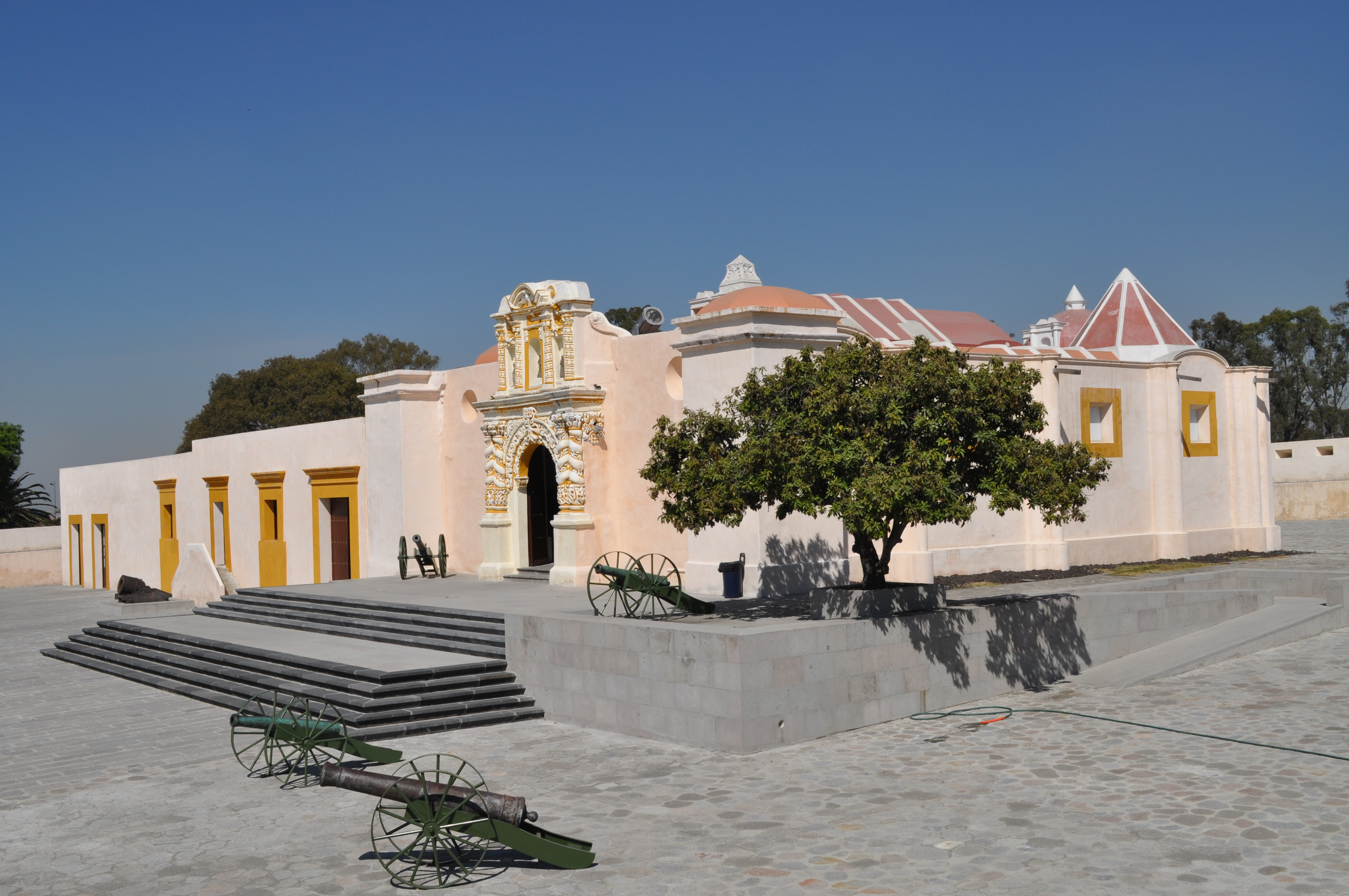
Fort Loreto

Fort Loreto and Fort Guadalupe are located in the Centro Civico 5 de Mayo part of the city. Both were instrumental to the Battle of Puebla on 5 May 1862. The chapel of the Loreto fort contains a former chapel, which is now the Museo de la No Intervención (Museum of Non-Intervention). This is to commemorate a non-aggression pact signed by Mexico and Central American and two South American countries in the 1960s. The Museo de Guerra del Fuerte (Fort War Museum) de Loreto y Guadalupe is located in this fort as well. This museum contains cannons, shotguns, swords, documents and other objects related to this battle.

The Galería de Arte Contemporáneo y Diseño (Gallery of Contemporary Art and Design) is dedicated to visual arts such as painting, sculpture, ceramics, metal etching, photography, video, and others and belongs to the Secretary of Culture of the state of Puebla. It is housed in the old La Violeta textile factory, which dates back to 1908, and was one only many factories in this area at that time. This building was renovated between 1995 and 1998 for this museum.

The International Museum of the Baroque is a museum of Baroque art designed by Japanese architect Toyō Itō. It opened on February 4, 2016.

The Museo de José Mariano Bello y Acedo was initially founded with the private collection of the Bello family, along with works donated by friends. It originally began as a private museum or pinacotheca. Upon José Mariano's death, the house and collection was bequeathed to the city.

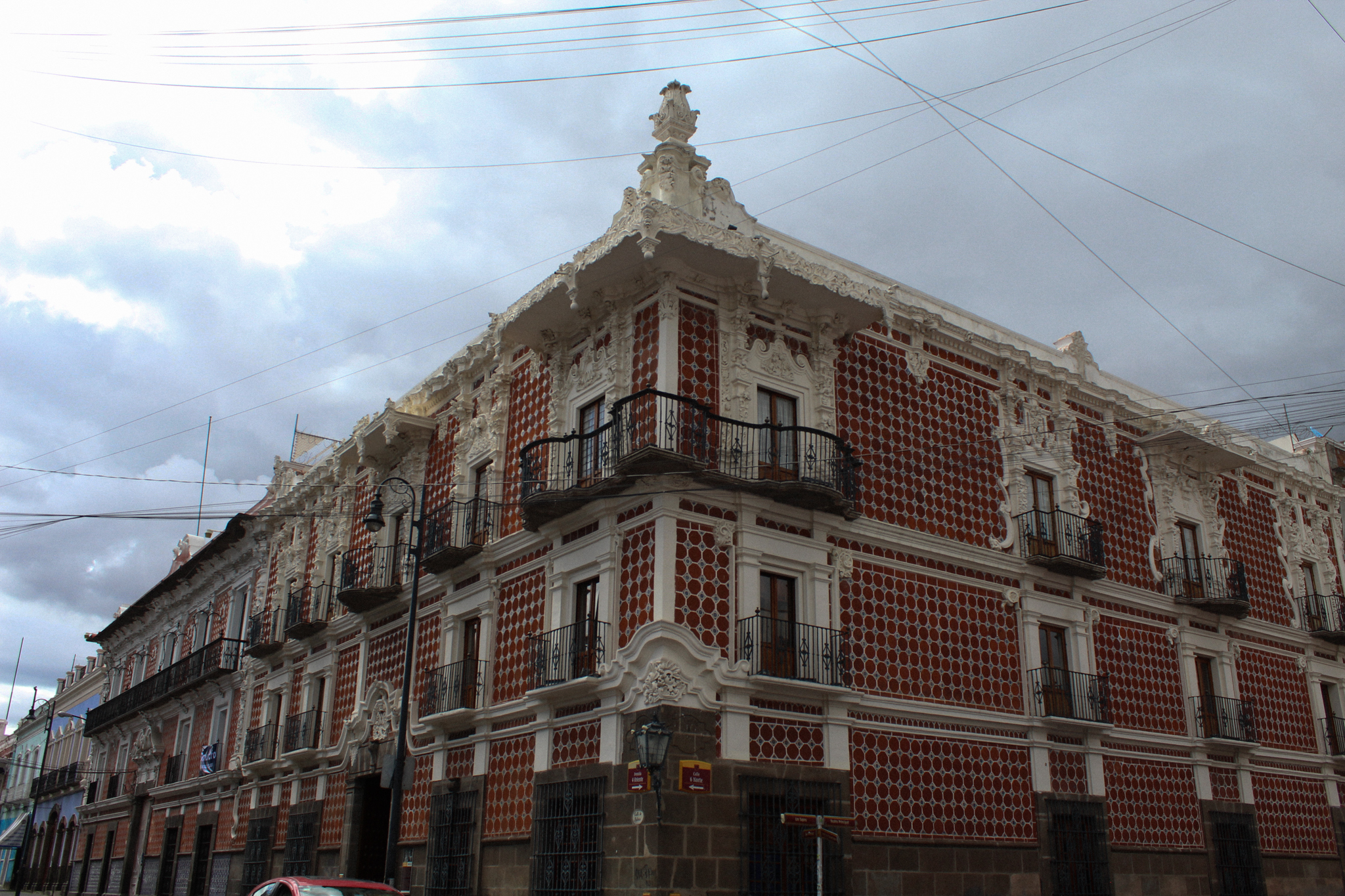
Casa de Alfeñique

The Casa de Alfeñique is named for the intricate mortar work that covers its façade. Alfeñique is a kind of sugar and almond candy. It was constructed by Antonio Santamaría de Incháurregui for Juan Ignacio Morales, who was a master ironsmith. The façades also contain ironwork balconies, cornices and a crown. The house was left to the state by Alejandro Ruiz Olavarrieta in 1896. It was first used to house the first public museum in the city of Puebla. The collection contains more than 1,500 pieces of a historical nature.

The Museo de Arte (Museum of Art) originally was constructed to be the Temple of San Pedro, founded in 1541 to be a church and a hospital. Eventually it was established as the Hospital of San Pedro y San Pablo under the direction of the Cathedral of Tlaxcala. It was functioning as a hospital by 1544, but it incurred major expenditures, forcing it to limit service to men only. The arches of the main courtyard were completed in 1640, as well as it fountain and nursing units. In the first half of the 18th century, the hospital ceased to be under the direct control of the cathedral, passing to the monks of the order of San Juan de Dios. In the latter half of the century, it began to house soldiers in order to improve its finances. The hospital underwent major reforms in the early 19th century to improve medical care, and began to receive medical students from the Medical-Surgical Academy of Puebla. In 1867, the facility became the Hospital General del Estado. In 1917, the hospital moved to new facilities in the city. Through most of the 20th century, the building was used for a wide-variety of purposes. In 1998, a project to restore the building for its use as Puebla Museum of Viceregal Art. In 2002, this museum was converted into the San Pedro Museum of Art, which exhibits works from various epochs.

The Museum Workshop of Erasto Cortés Juárez was the home of one of the major figures in fine and graphic arts in Puebla in the 20th century. The museum was founded in 2000 and contains more than 400 pieces of both his work and personal effects. The museum also hosts temporary exhibits, workshops and seminars.

=== Cathedrals and churches ===
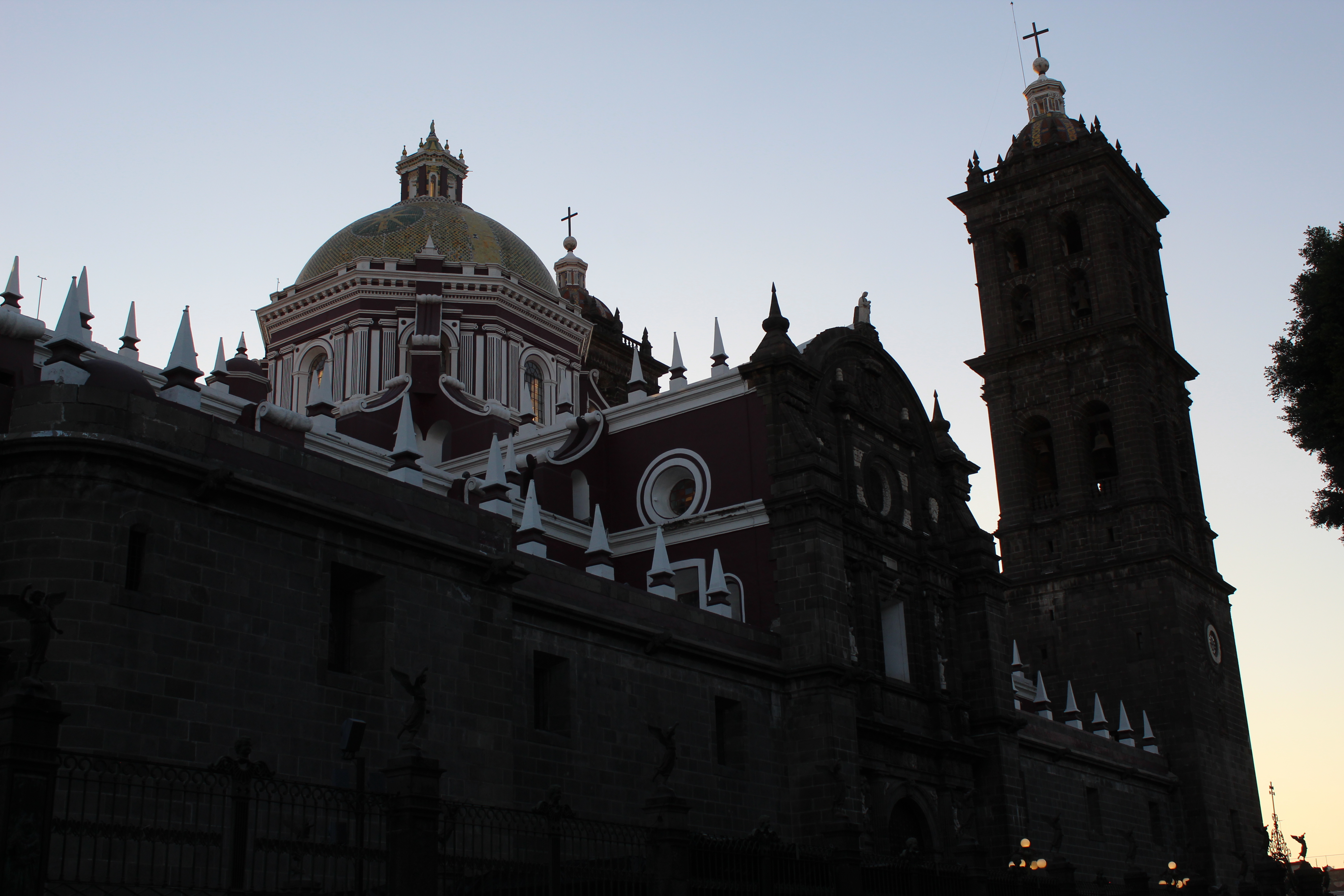
Side picture of the Puebla Cathedral

Puebla Cathedral, located on 16 de Septiembre and 5 Oriente, took 300 years to complete, in part due to interruptions in its construction. The cathedral was begun in 1575 under orders of Philip II of Spain by architects Francisco Becerra and Juan de Cigorondo. The building was consecrated in 1649 even though only half of the walls and much of the roof were missing and the towers not yet built. The north tower was added in 1678 and the south tower in 1768.The shape of the cathedral is a Latin cross and contains five naves. The main altar is octagonal, with four others oriented to the cardinal directions The complex consists of fourteen chapels in various styles with numerous artistic works such as the main cupola and the main altar, both decorated by Cristóbal de Villalpando. The façade is classified as late Baroque in transition to Neoclassical, with Doric and Corinthian columns. Its bell towers stand at just under 70 meters high, the tallest in Mexico. The seating in the choir is made of parquetry of fine woods, onyx and ivory of Moorish design. The two organs were donated by Charles V. In the crypt under the cathedral, numerous statues of saints and angels made of onyx can be seen.

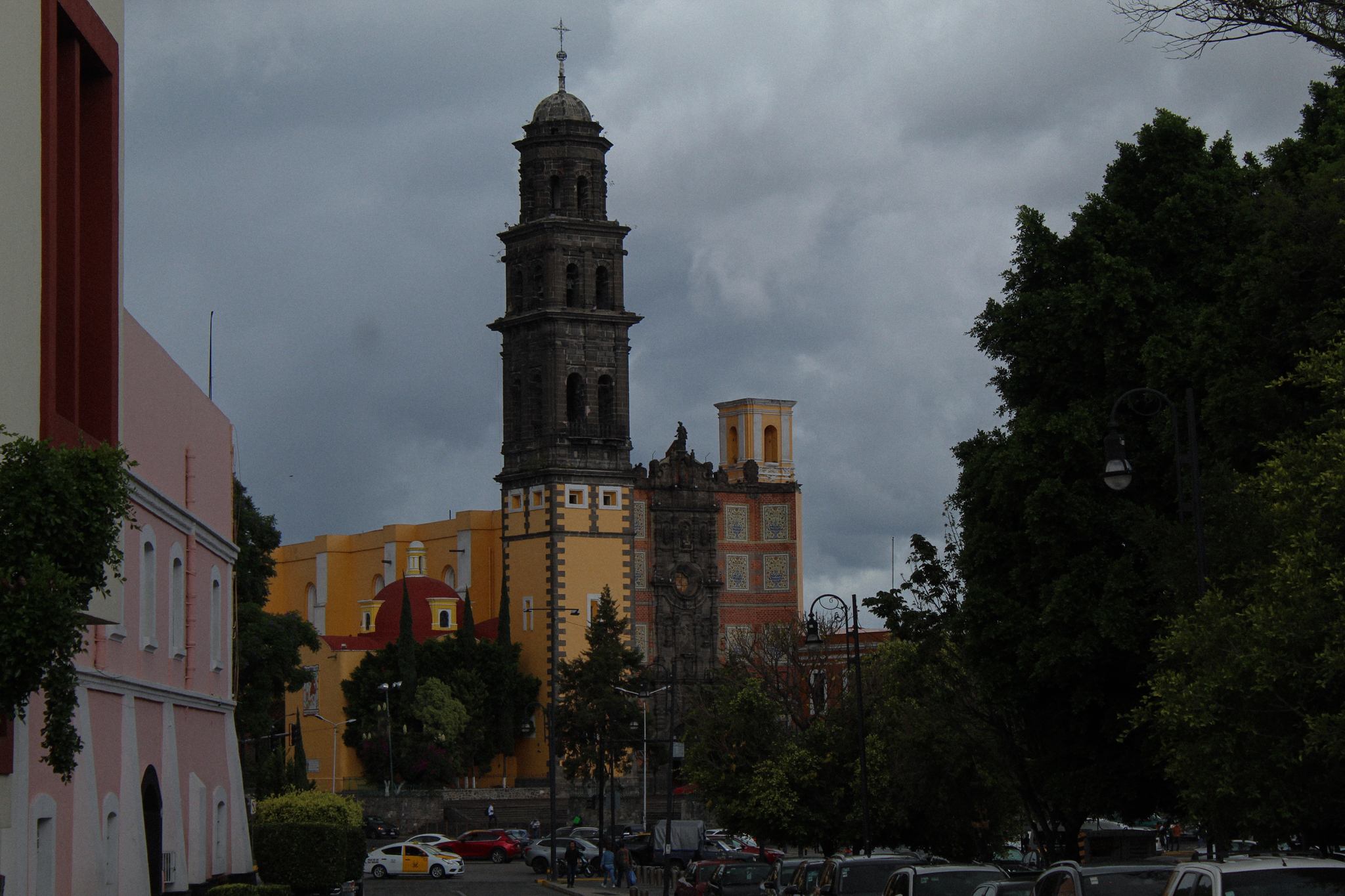
Facade of the Church and Friary of San Francisco

The Church and Friary of San Francisco is on Blvd Heroes del 5 de Mayo. Its elevated four-level tower stands out with its mouldings and Ionic and Doric pilasters. The main façade is done in gray cantera stone in which are sculpted large jars and flowers. The main portal is of Churrigueresque style, flanked by large panels of tilework surrounded by Plateresque decoration. Inside is a Plateresque choir, Neoclassic altarpieces and the mummified body of the beatified, and soon to be canonized as a saint, Sebastian de Aparicio.

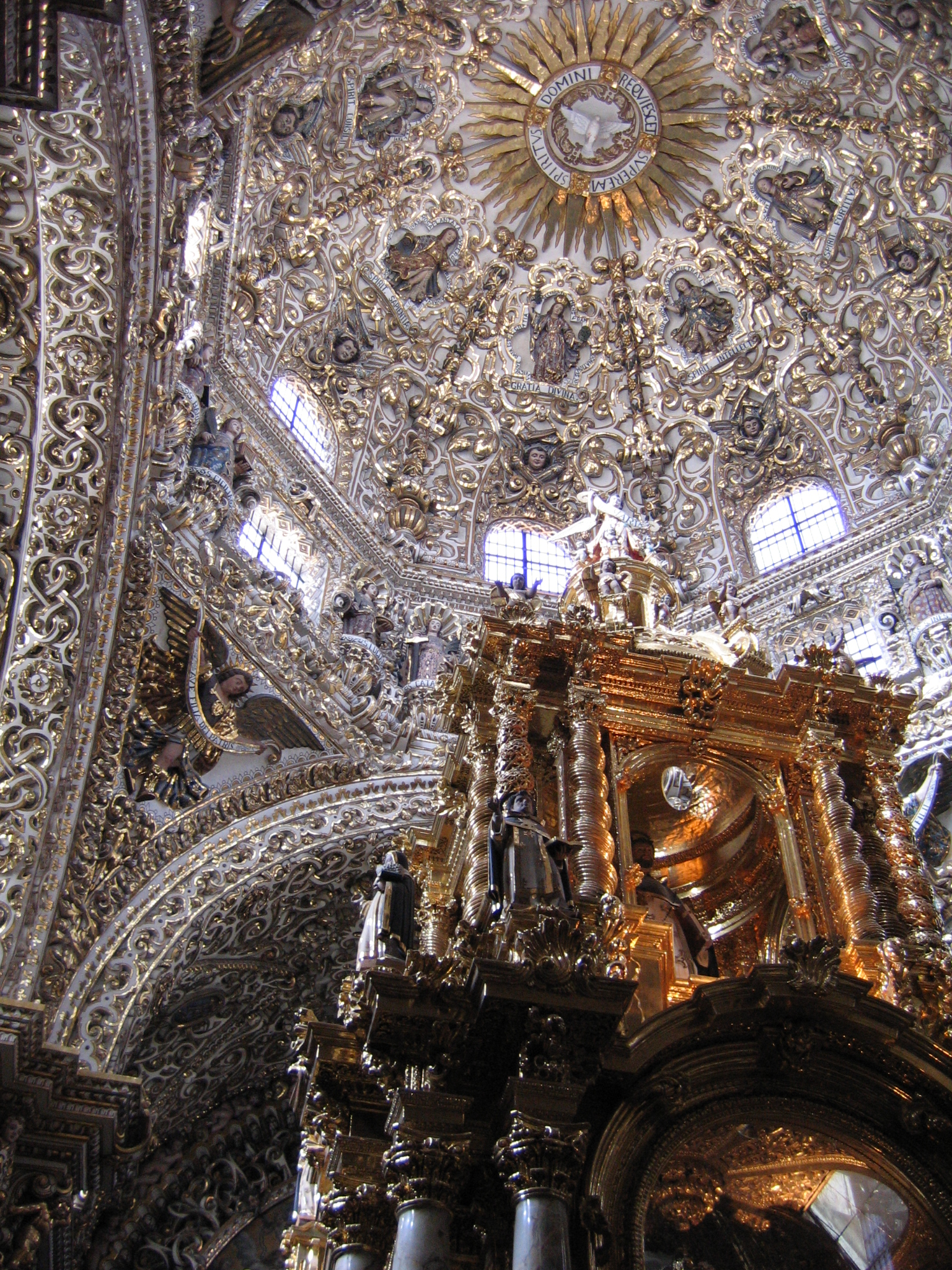
Nave and altar of the Chapel of the Rosario

The large friary complex houses an active group of Franciscan friars, who in addition to running a large K-12 school on the site, also work in other pastoral, justice, peace, and environmental activities.

The Church of Santo Domingo is located on 5 de Mayo Street. The main portal is of pure classic style finished in gray cantera stone. It consists of three levels with paired Doric-like columns. The façade of the old monastery is highly decorated in Baroque style, in front of which is a large atrium. Inside the ceiling consists of two large vaults and contains gilded altarpieces in Baroque, Salmonic and Churrigueresque styles.

The Chapel of the Rosary is located in the Church of Santo Domingo. The chapel was built between 1650 and 1690 and was the first to be dedicated to the Our Lady of the Rosary. The chapel is filled with symbolism, as it is filled with images and elements which are representative of the Baroque of New Spain. This symbolism is principally meant to aid with the evangelization process. The chapel contains three themes important to the Church, the mysteries of the rosary, the virtues associated with it and the Virgin of the Rosary herself. The cupola is in the shape of the crown of the Virgin Mary. The chapel is decorated with sculpted plaster that has been gilded done by local artists. There are also six paintings done by José Rodriguez Carnero as well as paintings by the altar depicting the life of the Virgin.

=== Other notable buildings ===
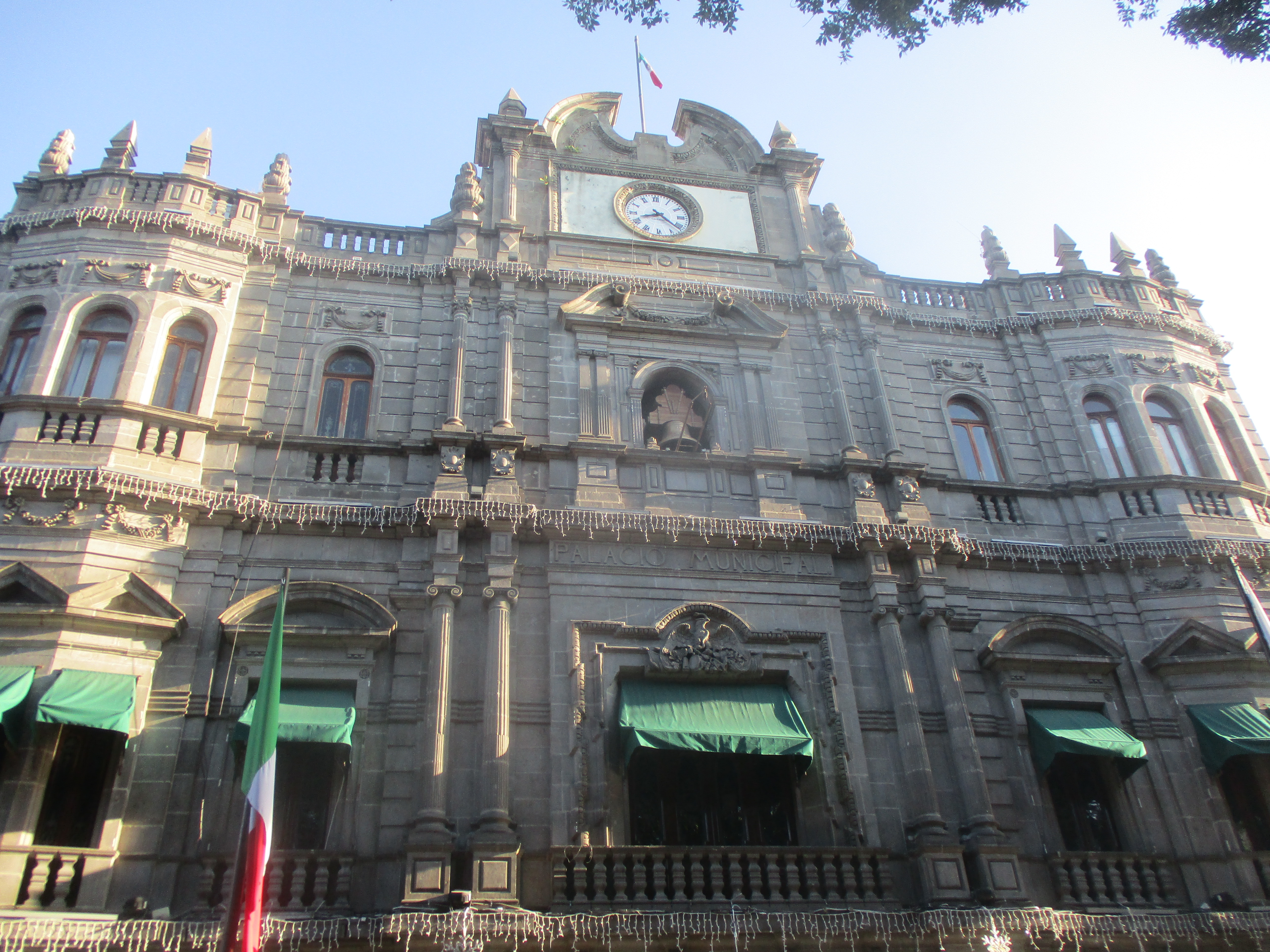
Portal Hidalgo and Municipal Palace, in the historic centre

The Casa del Deán is the oldest noble house in the city of Puebla, constructed by Tomás de la Plaza Goes, who was the deacon of the Cathedral of Puebla. It was finished in 1580. The building remained practically intact until 1953, when it was going to be demolished to construct a movie theater. Protests to save the building, due to its murals and façade, succeeded in preserving only a portion of the building. The murals are frescos, which are the only surviving non-religious examples from the 16th century in their original place in Mexico. The gray stone façade is completely smooth to let the main portal, of Renaissance style, stand out. The portal contains and upper and lower portion with a crest.

The Teatro Principal de Puebla (Main Theater of Puebla) was inaugurated in 1761 by Miguel de Santamaría. In 1902, the theater burned down, and was rebuilt in 1940, and again in 1998. The theater hosts cultural events and art shows featuring regional, national and international artists.

The Municipal Palace is located on Maximino Avila Camacho. The façade is made of gray cantera stone in Renaissance style, using Ionic columns and pediments, differing from the other buildings that border the main plaza. The portal has two levels topped by a central garret, in which there is a clock and towers on each side.

The Fountain of the China Poblana is located on Blvd Heroes de 5 de May. It is a monumental work done in cantera stone and Talavera tile, with a base of about thirty meters in diameter. In the center is a column that supports two large bowls and a sculpture of the China Pobalana which is over three meters high. This fountain was inaugurated in September 1971. The monument was sculpted by Jesús Corro Ferrer, who portaraited the China Poblana using the image of his own wife - María del Consuelo López y Martínez. The Monument to Rafael Cabrera is also located in the city.

Puente de Ovando is a small stone bridge across the river, in the Analco neighborhood of Puebla, built in 1775.

=== Cuisine ===
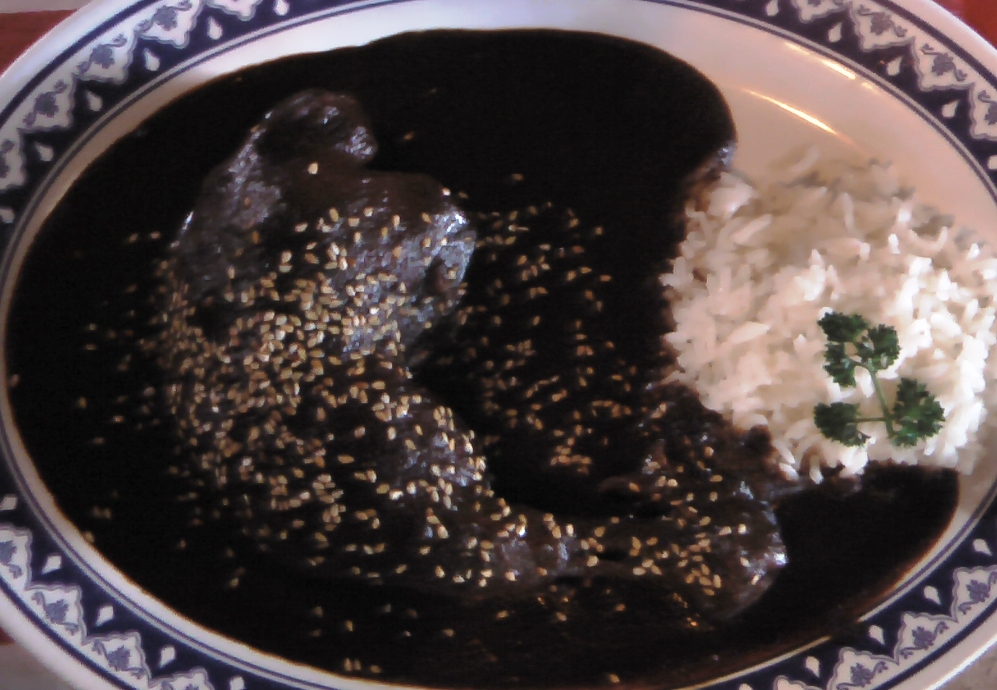
Mole poblano

The best-known mole is named after the city of Puebla, mole poblano. The origin of this sauce is disputed and there are two versions of the legend that are most often cited. The first states that 16th century nuns from the Convent of Santa Rosa were worried because they had just found out that the archbishop was going to visit them and they had nothing to prepare for him except for an old turkey in the yard. Supposedly due to divine inspiration, they began to mix together many of the spices and flavorings they had on hand in the kitchen, including different types of chili peppers, other spices, day-old bread, chocolate and approximately twenty other ingredients. They let the sauce simmer for hours and poured it over the turkey meat. Fortunately, the archbishop was very pleased with the meal and the nuns were able to save face.

The other story states that the sauce is of pre-Hispanic times and this was served to Hernán Cortés and the other conquistadors by Moctezuma II. The Aztecs did have a preparation called "chilmulli", which in Nahuatl means "chili pepper sauce". However, there is no evidence that chocolate was ever used to flavor prepared foods or used in chilmulli. What has happened is that the sauce gained ingredients as it was reinterpreted over the colonial period. Many food writers and gourmets nowadays consider one particular dish, the famous turkey in mole poblano, which contains chocolate, to represent the pinnacle of the Mexican cooking tradition.

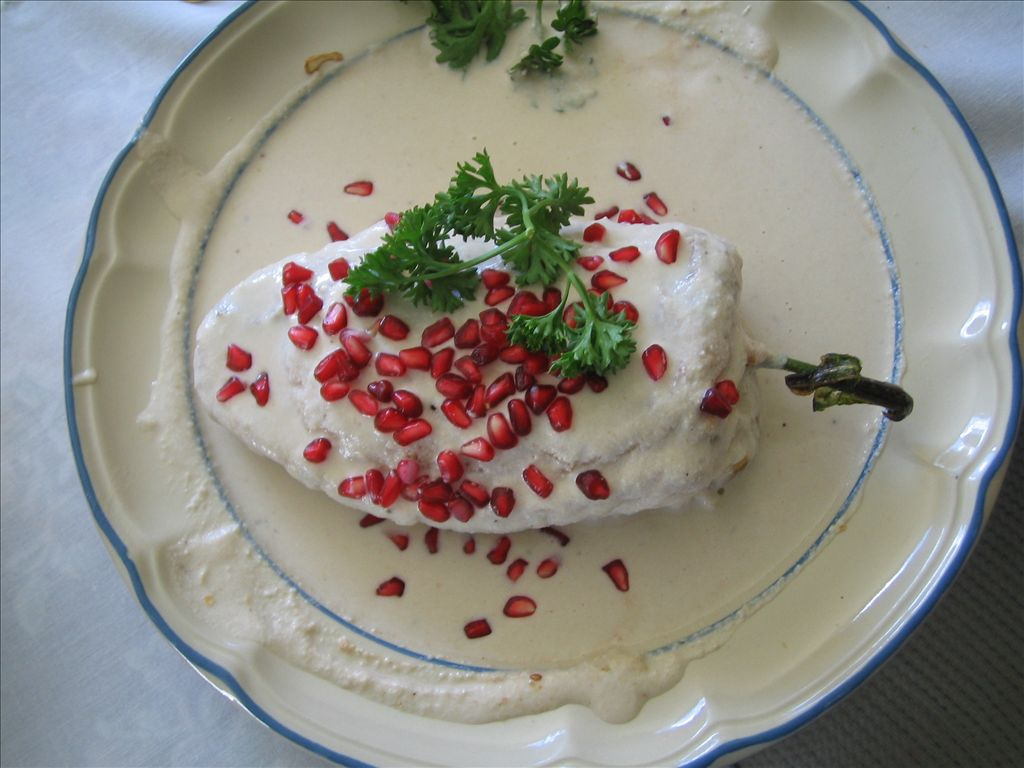
Chiles en nogada

Another famous dish, chiles en nogada, was also supposedly invented here. The story begins with three sisters from Puebla who met officers from Agustin de Iturbide's Army of the Three Guarantees in Mexico City and fell in love with them. Attempts were made to engage the couples but one problem was that none of the sisters knew how to cook. Upon returning to Puebla, their mother sent them to the Convent of Santa Monica to learn. The women decided they wanted to make an original dish to impress Iturbide and his officers when they were due to visit Puebla. The dish, chiles en nogada, represents the colors of the Mexican flag, green (parsley), white (the walnut sauce) and red (pomegranate seeds). The dish was served for the first time at a banquet for Iturbide with great success.

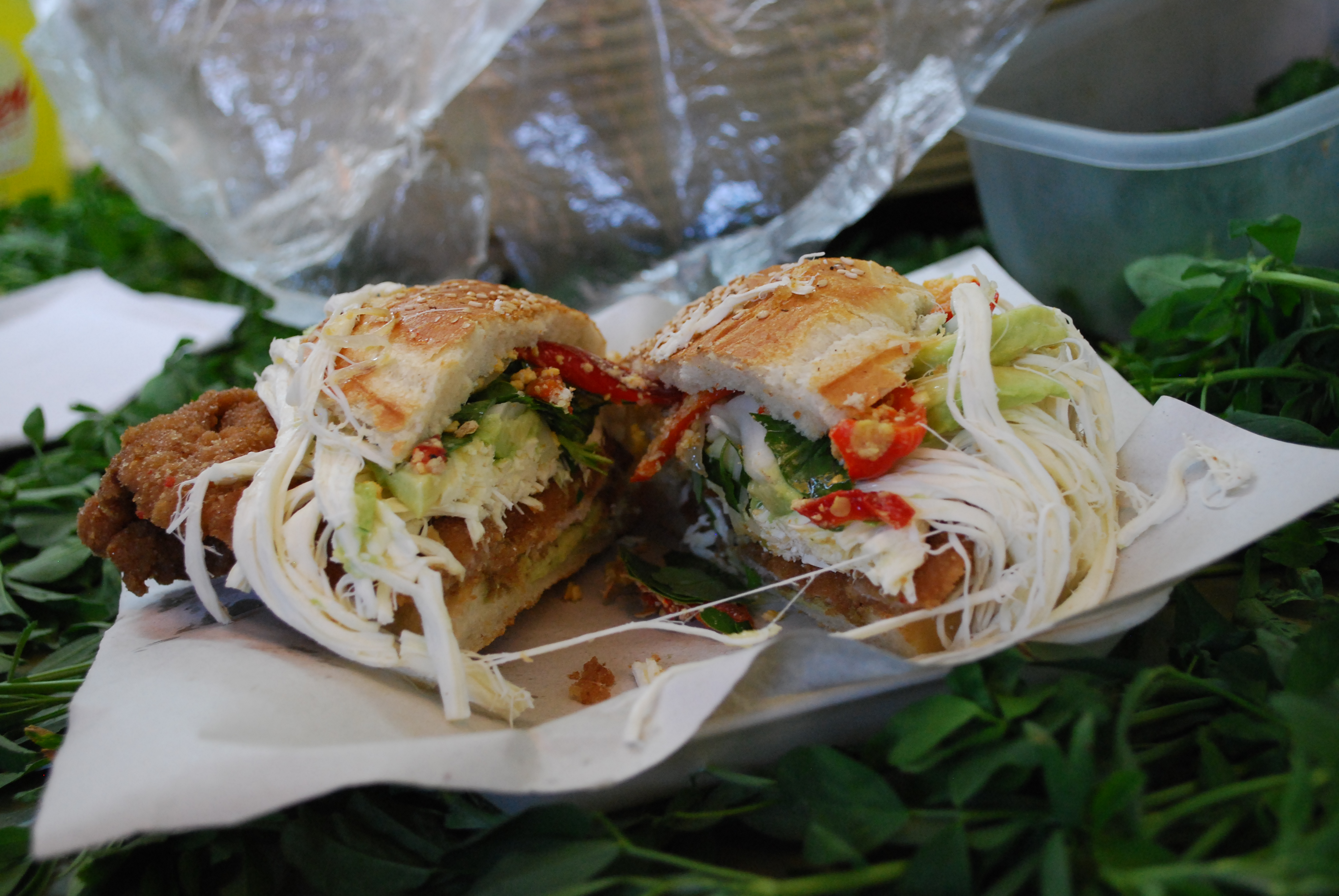
Cemita with milanesa

Another signature dish in Puebla is the "cemita", which is a type of well-stuffed sandwich on a bun. The cemita is considered to be "the sister of the Mexican torta, the first cousin of the pambazo, the distant cousin of the paste and the sandwich and the precursor to the giant tortas" that are now sold in most parts of Mexico today. This large, meaty sandwich is named after the bread on which it is served, a cemita. This bread is based on a bread introduced by the French during the period of the French Intervention in Mexico (1863–1867), but since then has evolved to suit Mexican tastes, especially in Puebla state. In the early 20th century, the bread began to be served sliced with a filling of leftovers, generally potatoes, beans, nopal, beef, chicken or pork. The Victoria Market in Puebla became famous for a version with beef hoof, onions and chili peppers with a vinaigrette sauce. Other markets and food stands soon created their own versions of the cemita with just about any kind of filling combination possible. During the same time period, it became traditional to sprinkle sesame seeds onto the cemita bread, often with designs of flowers, stars, animals and other things. While the dish started out as a lower-class meal, it is now enjoyed by people of all social classes in the city as a form of fast-food.

=== Talavera pottery ===
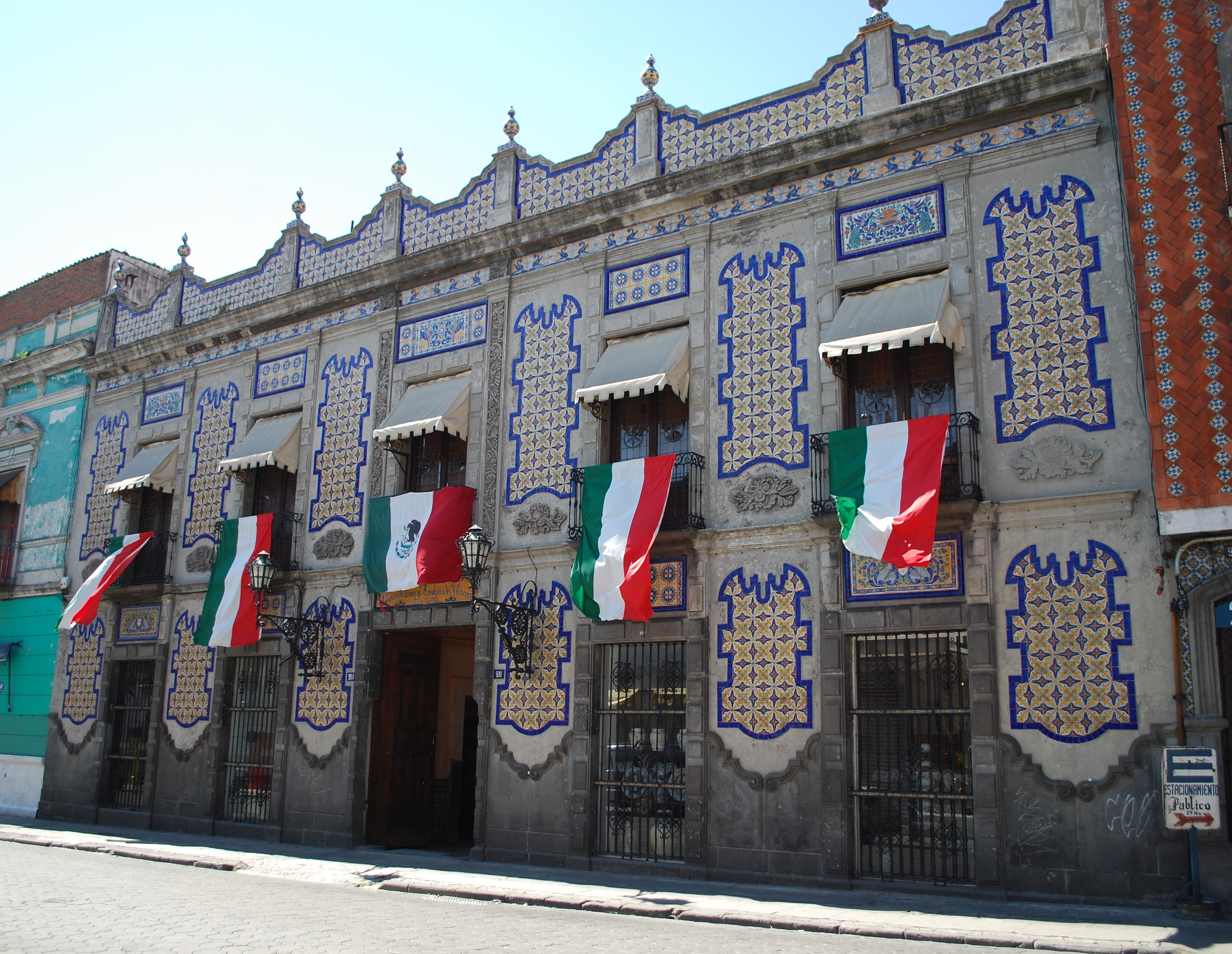
Uriarte Talavera workshop facade

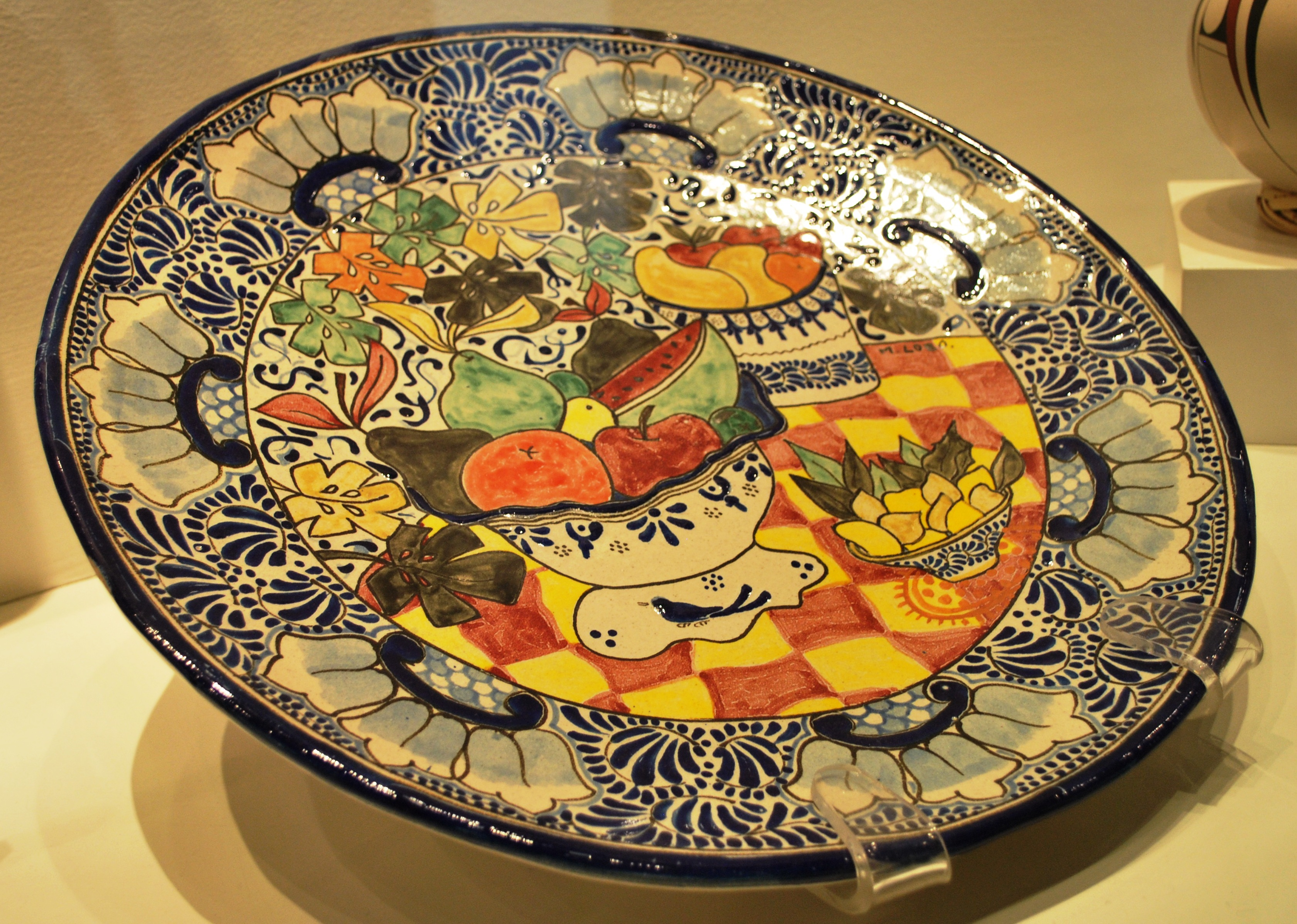
Talavera plate by Marcela Lobo

Soon after its foundation, Puebla was well known for its fine ceramics, especially for the style that would be called Talavera. This has been due to the abundance of quality clay in the region, drawing some of the best artisans. Between 1550 and 1570, Spanish potters from Talavera de la Reina in Spain came to Puebla to teach the locals European techniques of using the potter's wheel and tin-glazing. These new methods were mixed with native designs to give rise to what became known as Poblano Talavera. The glazing technique was first used for the tiles that still decorate many of the buildings in this city. Later, it was used to make pots, plates, jars, religious figures and other items. By the mid-17th century, the industry here had become well-established. Guilds were formed and ordinances passed to ensure quality. Blue was used only on the most expensive pieces due to the cost of the mineral used to produce it. The period between 1650 and 1750 was known as the Golden Age.

In 1813, the constitution eradicated the potter's guild and revoked the ordinances established in 1653 to standardize production. Now anybody could use this ceramic method in any style they wanted, and the lack of regulations led to a decline in technique and artistic quality. The Talavera market crashed. Out of the 46 workshops in production since the 18th century, only seven remained. When Enrique Luis Ventosa, a 29-year-old Catalan, arrived in Puebla in 1897, there were just six workshops left. Ventosa was fascinated by the history and fine craft work that had distinguished Puebla from the rest of Mexico. He became the leading force behind a renaissance in Talavera ware.

Another impetus to the rebirth of Puebla tile was that collectors found out about it. In 1904 an American named Emily Johnston de Forest traveled to Mexico with her husband and discovered Talavera. She established contact with scholars, collectors, and dealers who assisted her in building her collection. Eventually her collection was given to the Metropolitan Museum of Art in New York City. Other museums, like the Philadelphia Museum of Art, built their own collections. The Franz Mayer Museum in Mexico City has the largest collection of 726 pieces.

=== Story of the China Poblana ===
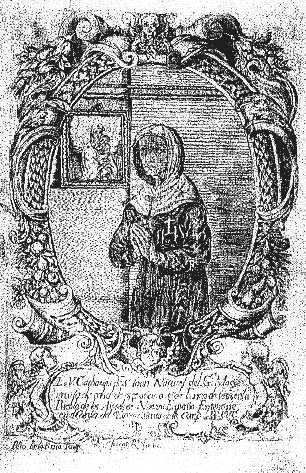
Catarina de San Juan, in a 17th-century woodcut

According to colonial-era published sources, a young Indian woman named Mirra was kidnapped by Portuguese pirates and taken to Cochin (modern-day Kochi), in the south of India. There, she escaped her kidnappers and took refuge in a Jesuit mission, where she was baptized with the name Catarina de San Juan. Mirra was again kidnapped by the same pirates that had taken her from her birth parents, and in Manila they delivered her to the merchant who later took her to New Spain. Once in Acapulco, she was sold to a Puebla merchant by the name of Miguel de Sosa. Through her life, Catarina or Mirra continued to dress in a sari. It is possible that this gave rise to the "china dress" that became popular in Mexico in the 17th century. A few years after her arrival in Mexico, Miguel de Sosa died, providing in his will for the manumission of his slave. She was taken in by a convent, where it is said she began to have visions of the Virgin Mary and Baby Jesus. The "China Poblana" died on 5 January 1688 at the age of 82. In Puebla, she was venerated as a saint until 1691, when the Mexican Inquisition prohibited open devotion to her. Today, the Templo de la Compañía, in Puebla, is known as La Tumba de la China Poblana because in its sacristy lie the remains of Catarina de San Juan.

=== Tunnel system ===
There have long been rumours of a system of tunnels under the city. Long considered to be an urban legend, they were rediscovered in 2015. They are believed to be up to 500 years old and are thought to extend for more than 10 km.

== El Cinco de Mayo ==
Every year on 5 May, Puebla celebrates the defeat of invading French troops here in 1862. Celebrations include several days of concerts, lectures, other cultural activities. On the 5th itself, there is a very large parade and a re-enactment of the battle. The parade includes Mexican Army, Navy, Special Forces and soldiers dressed in period uniform. The military displays tanks, Humvees and armored personnel carriers. Civilian participation includes school bands, students and floats, both from Mexico and from abroad.

== Education ==
Puebla has many universities, second in the country only after Mexico City. The main university of the city is the Benemérita Universidad Autónoma de Puebla (BUAP), the oldest and largest university in the region, founded on 15 April 1587. Other public university is the Instituto Tecnológico de Puebla (ITP). The city is also home for one of the most prestigious private universities in Mexico and Latin America, Tecnologico de Monterrey, Universidad Iberoamericana Puebla and the Universidad de las Americas Puebla (UDLAP).

== Sports ==
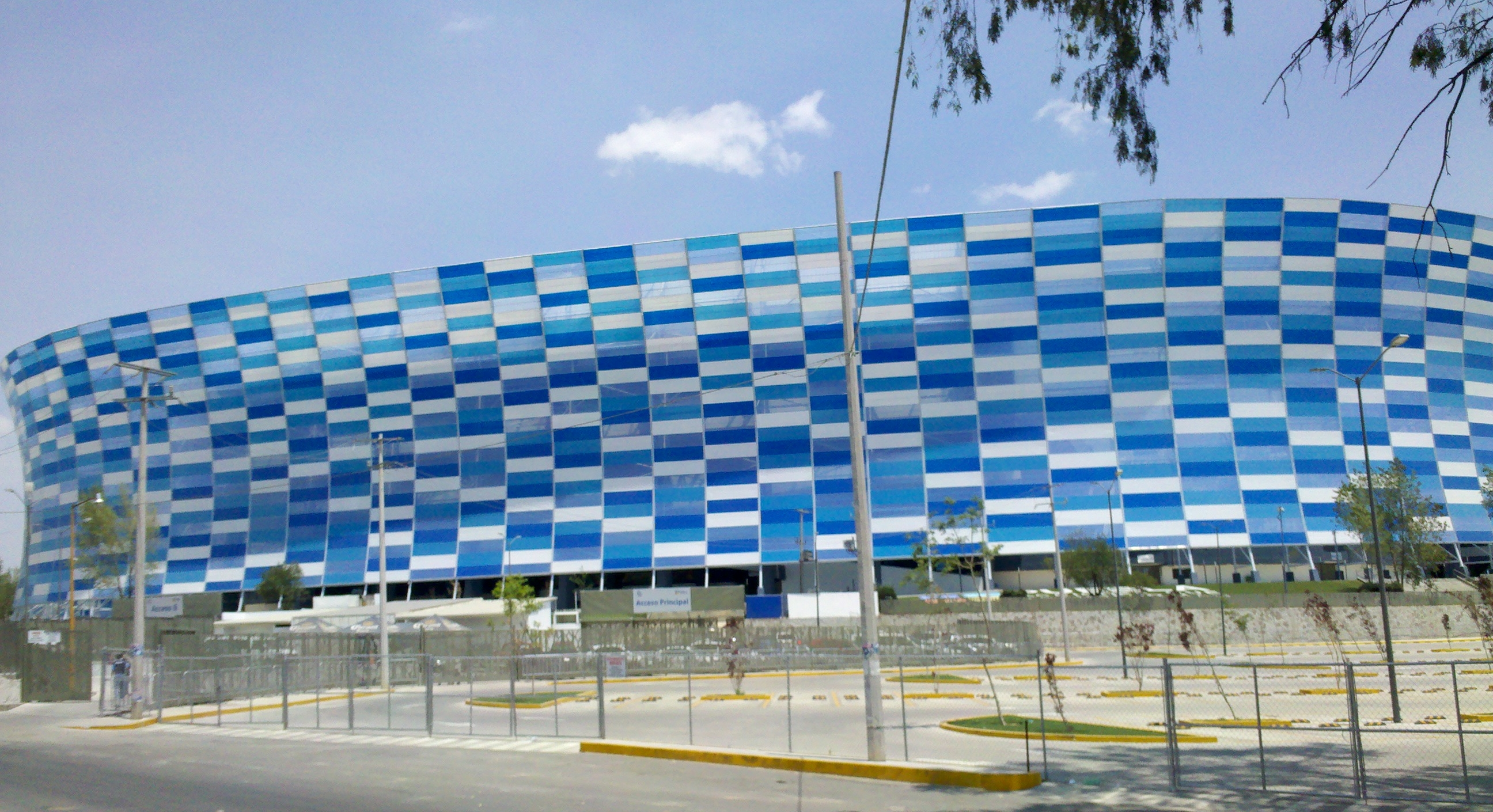
Cuauhtémoc Stadium

Team	Sport	League	Stadium
Club Puebla	Association football	Liga MX	Estadio Cuauhtémoc
Pericos de Puebla	Baseball	Mexican Baseball League	Estadio Hermanos Serdán
Aztecas UDLAP	College football	ONEFA	Estadio Templo del Dolor
Borregos Salvajes Puebla ITESM	College football	ONEFA	Cráter Azul

Puebla has one professional football team, Puebla F.C. The biggest football stadium in the city, Cuauhtémoc Stadium, with a capacity of 51,720, was built in 1968 as a second football field for the 1968 Olympic Games. Matches for the 1970 and 1986 FIFA World Cups were also played in Cuauhtémoc Stadium. In 2015 it was intervened to make it up to new Fifa standards which commodity, modernism and outside visual image have changed for the better. With a capacity of 51,720 it is the 4th biggest stadium in México just behind Jalisco Stadium. At 45.9 meters tall it is also the highest stadium from parking level to the highest most part of the roof beating the second tallest Aztec stadium by 4 meters.

Puebla has a professional baseball team, the Pericos de Puebla.

Puebla, through the conurbated area of Cholula, has one college American football team, the "Aztecas" of the Universidad de las Américas. The Aztecas have won the championship three times since the creation of the Mexican College Football Organization (ONEFA) in 1978 (1995, 1996, and 1997). The team has been runners-up in the league five times, most recently in 2006 and 2007, losing the championship game all five times to the ITESM Campus Monterrey Borregos Salvajes. The Aztecas' home stadium is the Templo del Dolor (Temple of Pain).

== Economy ==
Some agriculture still takes place in the municipality but environmental degradation and the growth of the city is making this a smaller sector of the economy. Crops raised include corn, beans, wheat, oats, avocados, pears, apples, peaches, choke cherries, Mexican hawthorns, nuts and white sapotes. Most agriculture takes place on small plots on the edges of the municipality. Similarly livestock such as cattle, pigs, sheep and horses are raised.

Industry accounts for about eighty percent of the economy and is mostly based in the outskirts of the city as well as in some surrounding municipalities. Main products include basic metals, chemicals, electrical items and textiles. The main employers are Hylsa and the Volkswagen automotive plant. A growing sector is food processing. Many industries are consolidated into parks such as the 5 de Mayo Industrial Park, the Resurrección Industrial Zone and the Puebla 2000 Industrial Park. Shopping centers include the Angelópolis Lifestyle Center and Parque Puebla.

== Transportation ==
Puebla is served by Puebla International Airport, which is part of the metropolitan airport group for the Mexican capital and an alternate airport for Mexico City. It provides domestic services and flights to the United States. The airport is also used as a place to manufacture goods and export and import due to prime location.

In January 2013 the first line of the rapid transit bus system named RUTA was opened to the public from Chachapa to Tlaxcalancingo, in April 2014 the second line was inaugurated going from North 11th street at the height of Diagonal Defensores de la República to Calle Limones, and in 2019 the third line was added to the system, transporting passengers from Valsequillo to CAPU, the main hub for transport outside of the city. The Puebla–Cholula Tourist Train was inaugurated in January 2017 connecting Puebla with Cholula in the western end of the city. Operation of the tram-train ended on 31 December 2021.

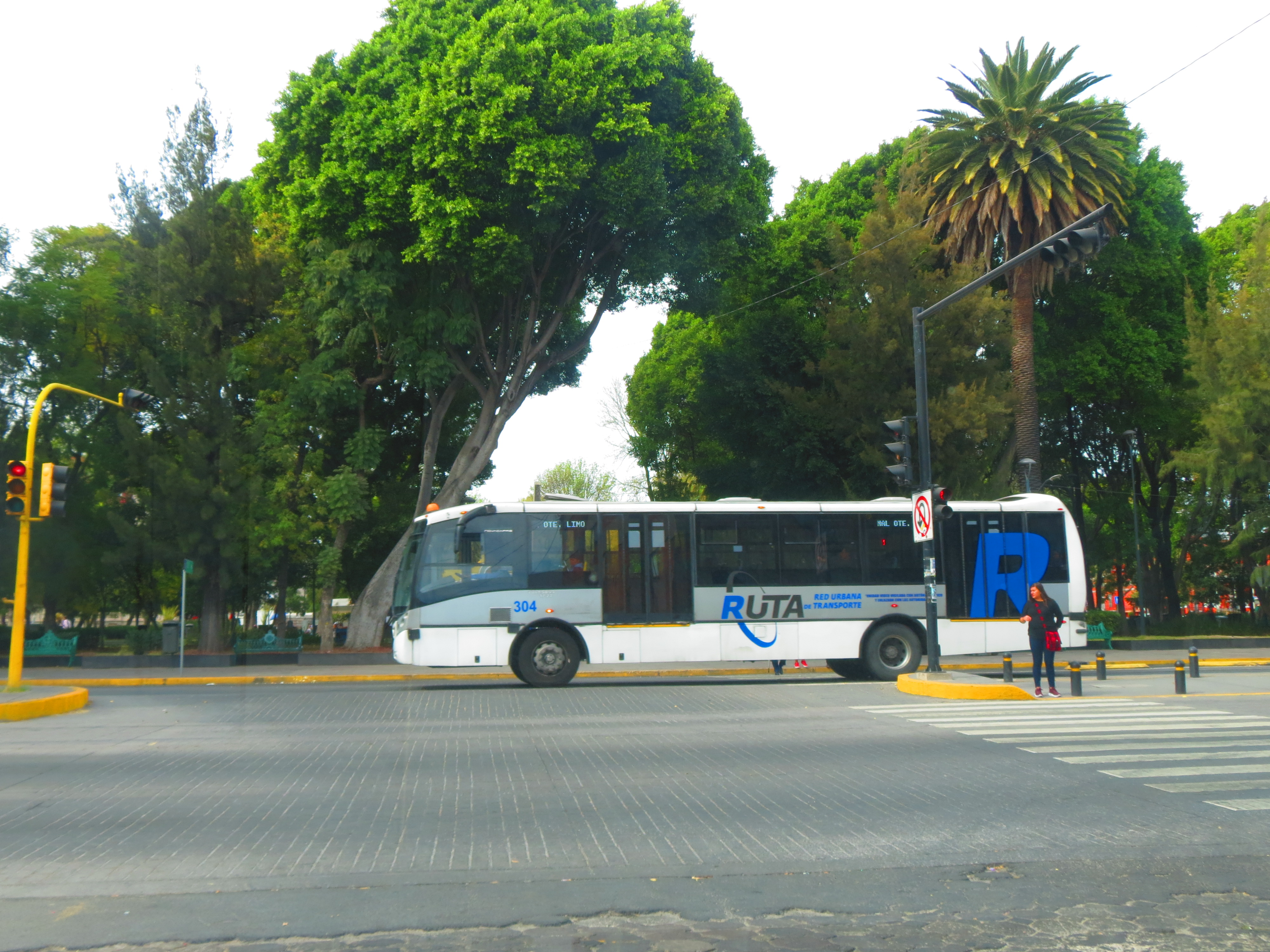
RUTA bus

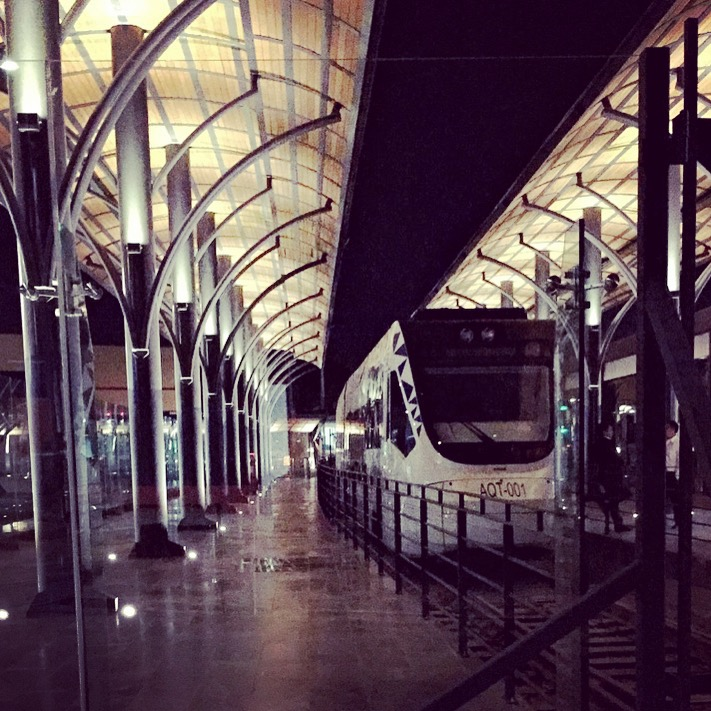
Puebla–Cholula Tourist Train

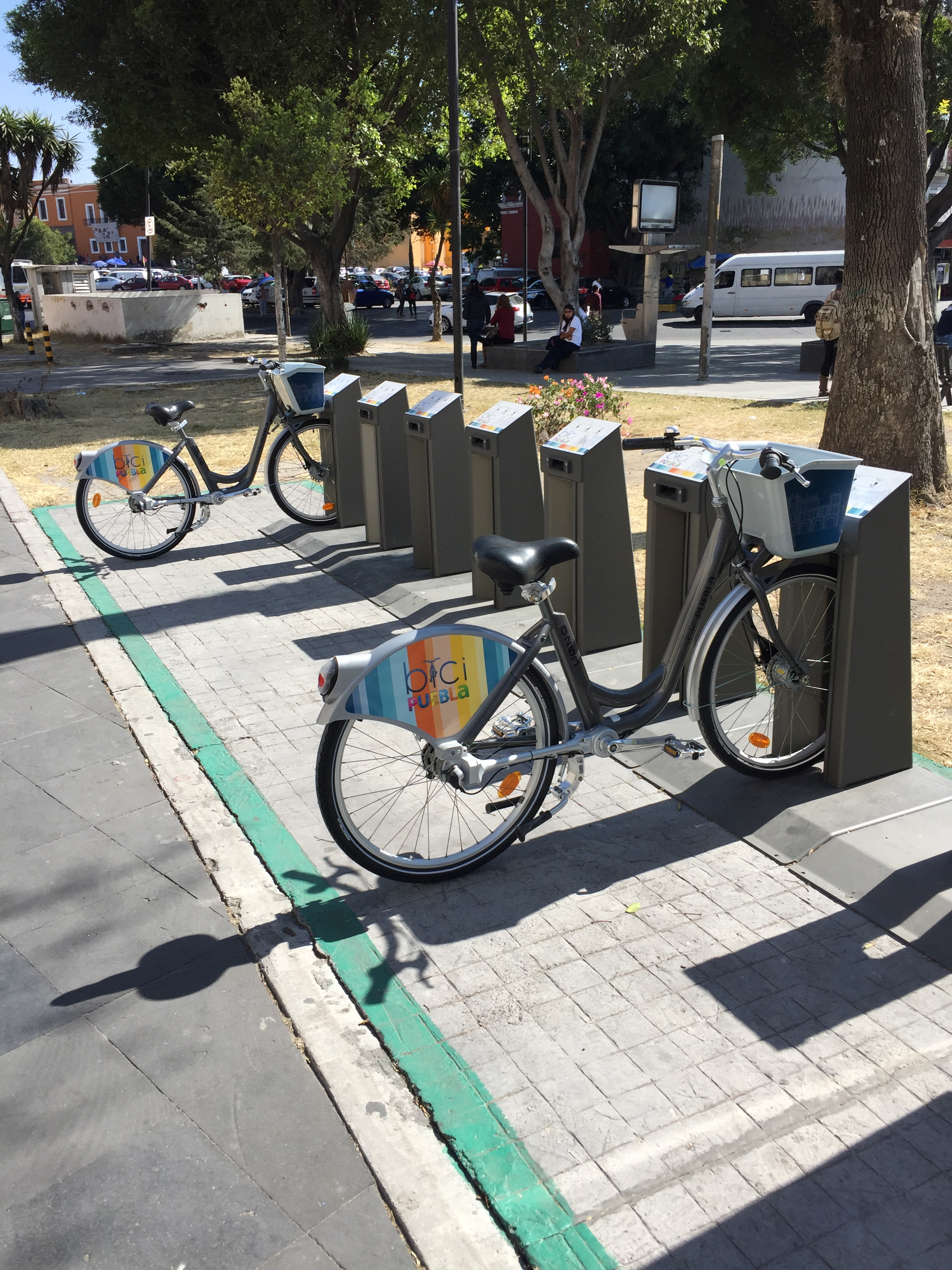
Bicycles for rent

== Notable people ==
- Sergio Almaguer – coach
- Martín Carrera – president of Mexico from August 12 to September 12, 1855
- Albert Baez – physicist, and father of folk singer-songwriter Joan Baez
- Martha Mariana Castro – television and film actress
- Luisito Comunica – YouTuber
- Alejandro Edda – actor
- Alberto Garcia Aspe – vice-president of Club Universidad Nacional
- Adrián Goransch – footballer
- Manuel Lapuente – coach
- Ángeles Mastretta – writer
- Gabriel Palmeros – footballer
- Carlos Poblete – coach
- José Luis Sánchez Solá – coach
- Regina Torné – television and film actress
- Carmen Wenzel – sculptor, painter

== Sister cities ==
Puebla is twinned with:

- Cancún, Mexico
- Łódź, Poland
- Oklahoma City, United States
- Pueblo, United States
- Talavera de la Reina, Spain
- Burgo de Osma-Ciudad de Osma, Spain
- Xalapa, Mexico
- Wonsan, North Korea

== See also ==
- Artisanal Talavera of Puebla and Tlaxcala
- Battle of Puebla
