= Casa de los Azulejos =

Coordinates: 19°26′3.19″N 99°8′24.74″W

Casa de los Azulejos Palacio de los Condes del Valle de Orizaba
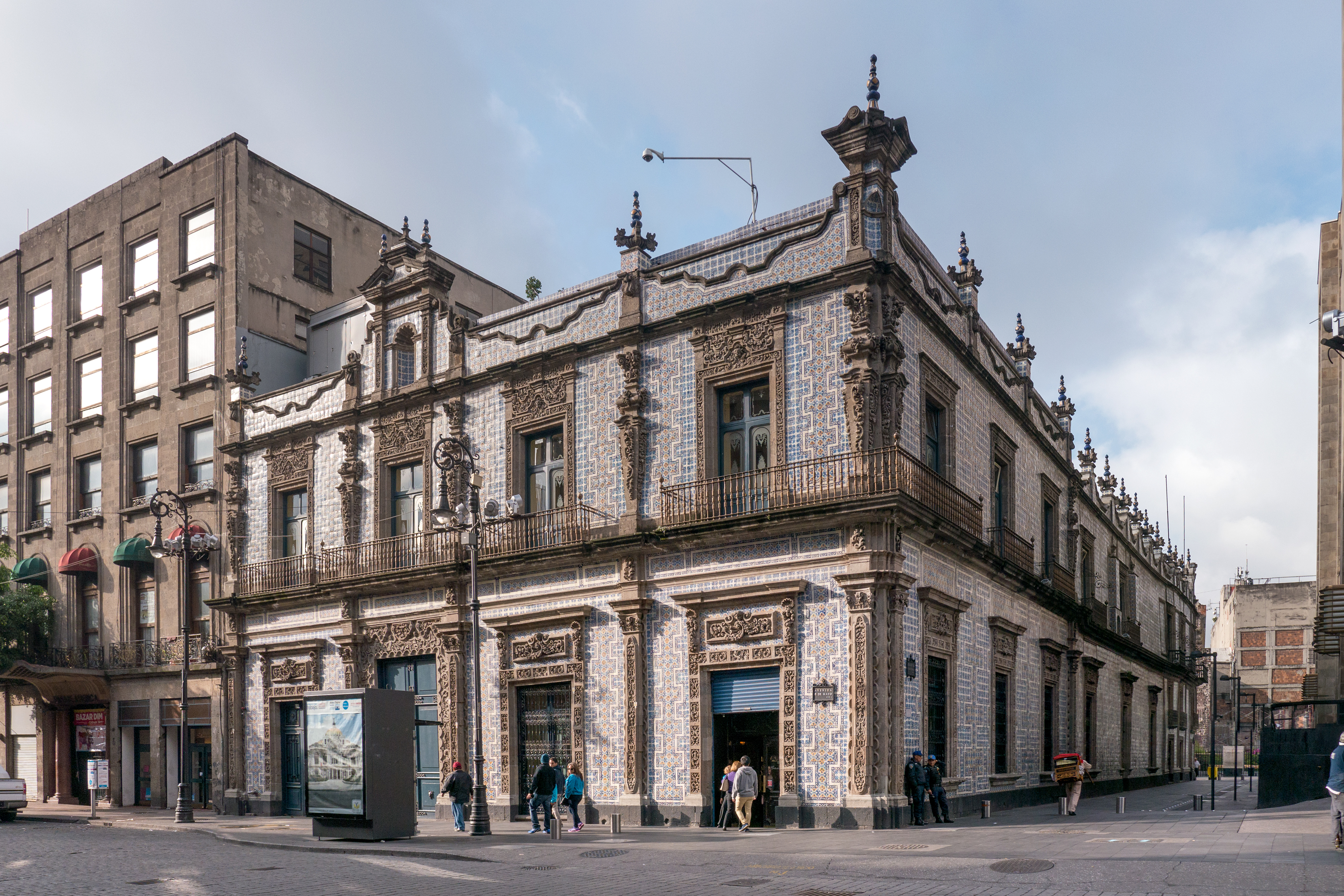
- View of the Casa de los Azulejos from 5 de Mayo Street

General information
- Architectural style: New Spanish Baroque
- Location: Mexico City, Mexico

The Casa de los Azulejos ("House of Tiles") or Palacio de los Condes del Valle de Orizaba (Palace of the Counts of Valley of Orizaba) is an 18th-century Baroque palace in Mexico City, built by the Count of the Valle de Orizaba family. The building is distinguished by its facade, which is covered on three sides by blue and white colonial Talavera tiles from Puebla state. The palace remained in private hands until near the end of the 19th century. It changed hands several times before being bought by the Sanborns brothers who expanded their soda fountain/drugstore business into one of the best-recognized restaurant chains in Mexico. The house today serves as their flagship restaurant.

The counts of the Valle de Orizaba began construction of the palace in the 16th century. Descendants of this House of Orizaba covered the exterior of the palace in 1737 with the azulejos that are seen today.

== The building of the house ==
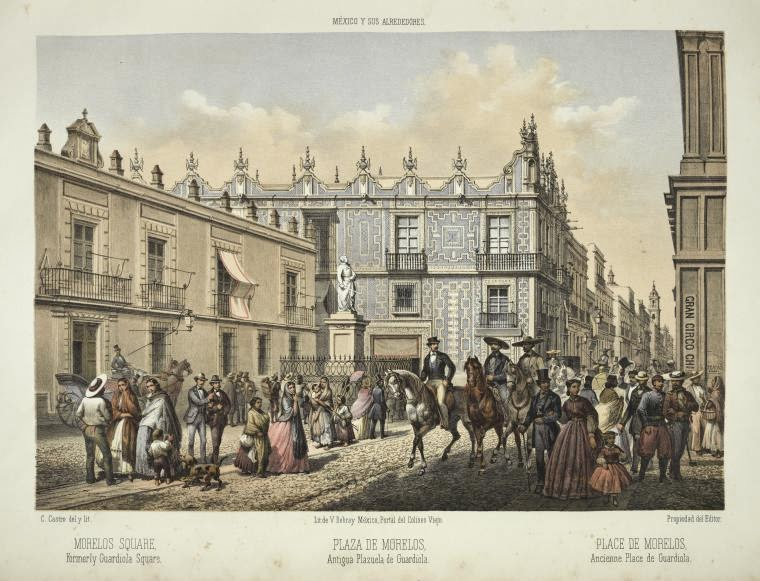
Casa de los Azulejos depicted in a painting of 1858 during the Reform War.

The house is currently on the Callejón de la Condesa, between 5 de Mayo Street and what is now Madero Street. Madero Street was laid out in the 16th century and originally called San Francisco Street, after the church and monastery here. Later it was called Plateros Street, because of all the silver miners and silversmiths located here. From the 16th century through most of the colonial period, it was one of the most desirable streets in the city. Before 1793, there were two houses on this site, which were joined through the merger of two Criollo families of New Spain, when Graciana Suárez Peredo and the second Count del Valle de Orizaba married. Both families were very rich and held noble titles. The current structure was begun in 1793.

== Countess families and Tile facade ==
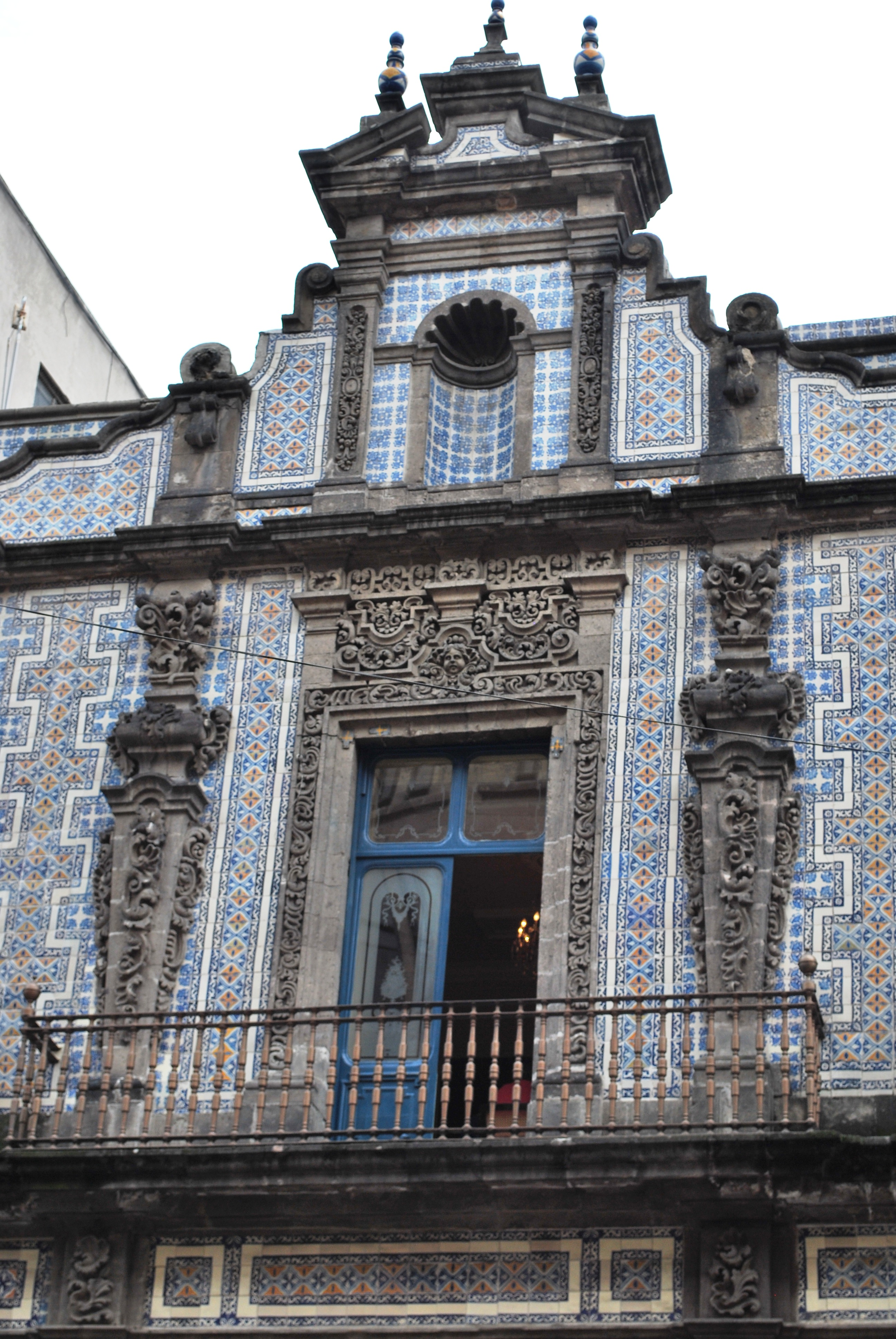
Part of the facade, with azulejos

It is known that the original construction was built in the 16th century, and that it is actually made up of the union of two stately mansions, of which the one that was originally located on the south side was the one that belonged, together with the so-called Plazuela de Guardiola to a man named Damián Martínez. These properties, although separated by an alley, were then located in front of the already busy and commercial Calle de Plateros, exactly in front of the Convent of San Francisco el Grande in Mexico City. From the history of this property, being the owner Don Damián and seeing himself in financial difficulties, they find it necessary to sell this and the adjoining square to another gentleman named Diego Suárez de Peredo in the year 1596. This gentleman, upon becoming a widower, He retired from the religious order of the Franciscans, who by then already had a convent located in the city of Zacatecas, where he decided to retire and spend the rest of his life, thus leaving the property in the hands of his daughter, who married with the second Count of the Valley of Orizaba named Luis de Vivero.

Don Luis was the son of the First Count of the Valley of Orizaba, Don Rodrigo de Vivero y Aberrucia, an outstanding character in the viceroyalty for his talent and education, reaching important positions in the government of New Spain, among which the Governor of Nueva Vizcaya and that of Governor and Captain General of the Philippine Islands stands out. Don Rodrigo inherited one of his properties that was attached to the house to his son (which was the North house), so Don Luis was the first of the family to inhabit the houses, which he ordered to unite and had them repaired.

The current appearance of the palace is not due to Don Luis, it is due to one of his descendants, Doña Graciana Suárez de Peredo the Seventh Countess of the Valley of Orizaba. She lived in the city of Puebla from her marriage until the death of her husband, in the year 1708. She then returned to the capital of the Viceroyalty of New Spain and made use of the property. In 1737, the Countess ordered a repair of several buildings which she owned. She requested the stonework and facade of the palace be completely covered with azulejos from Puebla. Diego Durán Berruecos worked on the arches, columns, skirting boards, doors, window cornices, as well as the balustrades.

== The rest of the house ==
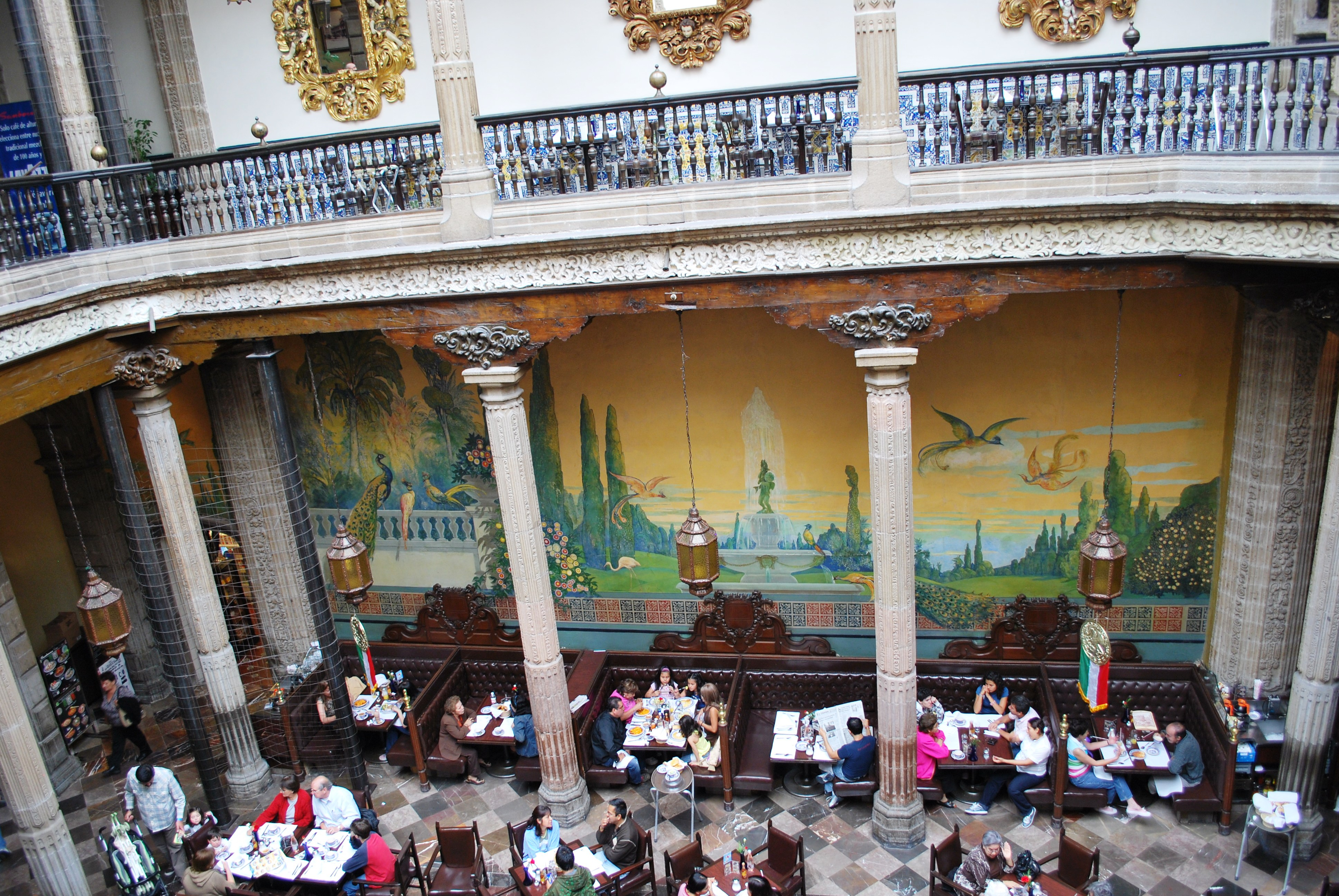
The peacock mural side of the courtyard.

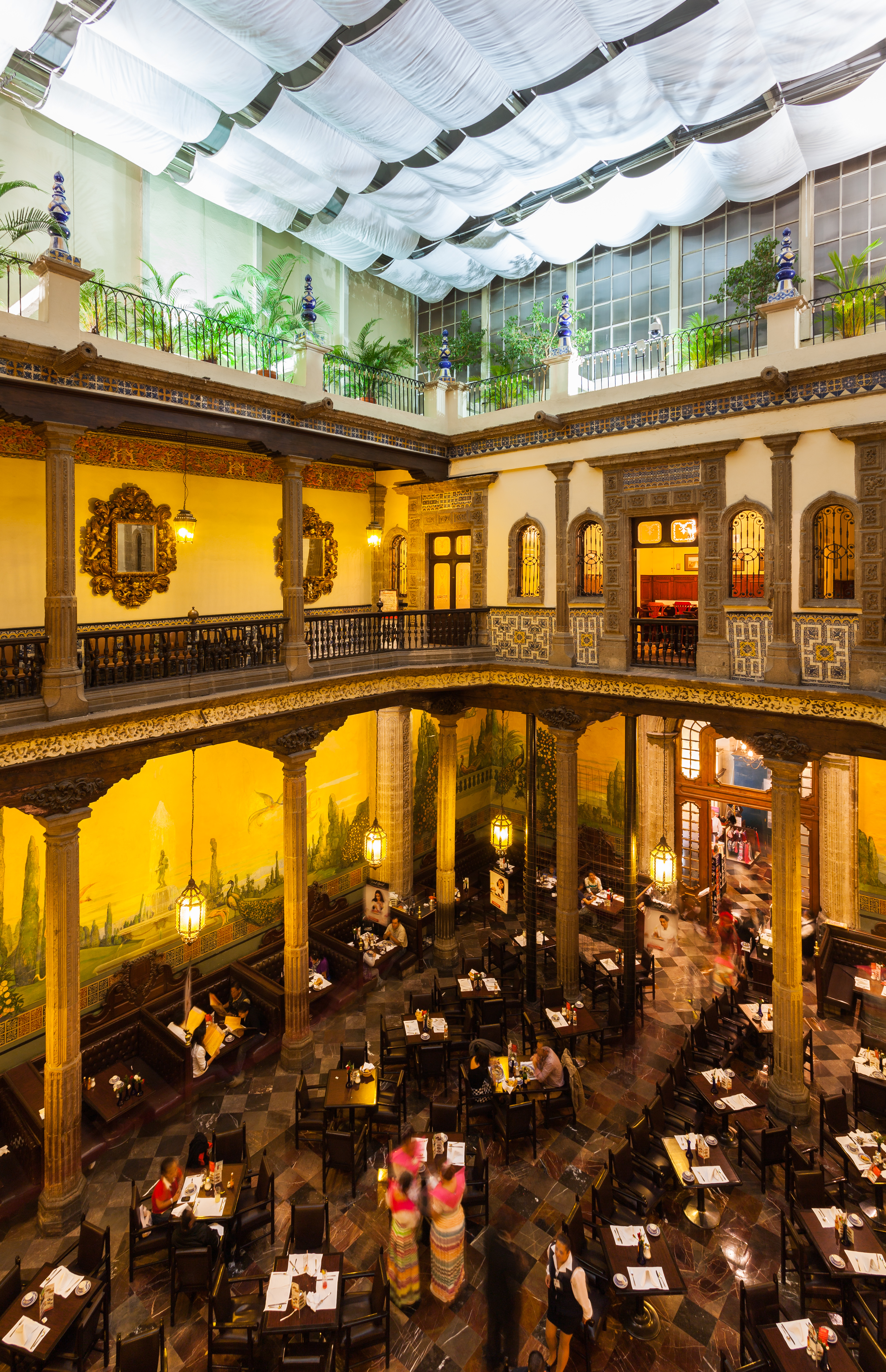
Courtyard at night.

The most notable feature of the exterior are the blue and white tiles from Puebla that cover the building on three sides. Its windows, balconies and doors are framed in carved stone and French porcelain crowns on the Callejón de la Condesa and Madero Street facades. Inside, the main courtyard contains a fountain crowned with mosaics. The fountain is surrounded by highly decorated columns and topped with more French porcelain crowns as well as a stained glass roof that was added in the 20th century. Both the fountain and columns show some damage. On the second floor, the courtyard railings are made of copper; some made in China and some made in Mexico. The overall look to the courtyard is generally Baroque but also somewhat Mudéjar.

There are two large murals in the interior. The first one is a peacock mural by Romanian painter Pacologue done in 1919. In the main stairway is one of the earliest works by José Clemente Orozco titled Omniscience and done in 1925. The three symbolic figures appearing in it represent masculine values, with their feminine counterparts and Grace presiding over them both. According to chronicler and poet Salvador Novo, the torso in the center was later copied by Orozco in the work called Prometheus at Pomona College. On the second floor, the facade of what was the chapel has a set of gold frames bedecked with angels. There is also a collection of porcelain art.

== 18th to early 20th century ==
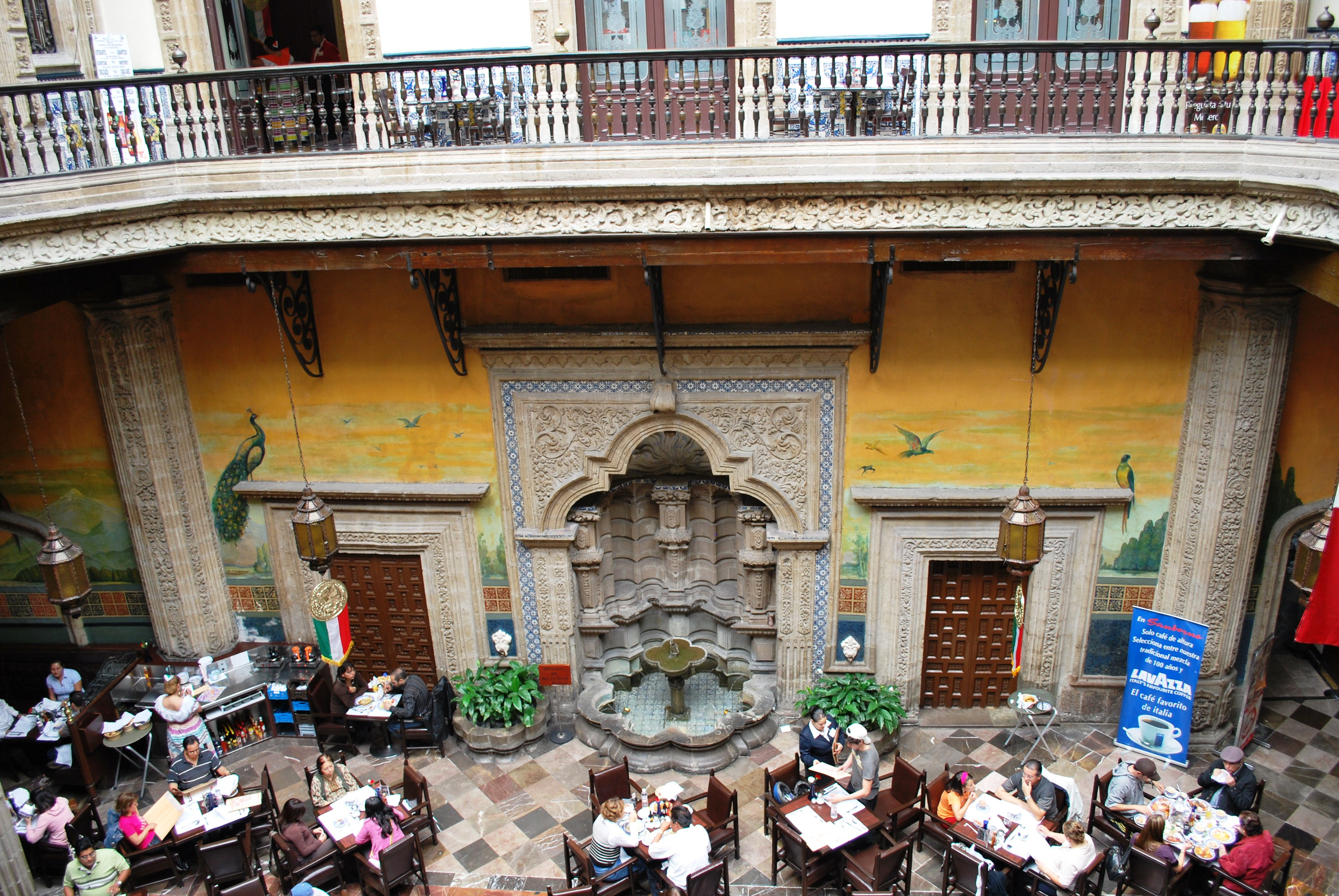
The colonial Baroque fountain of the palace, and the Sanborns restaurant

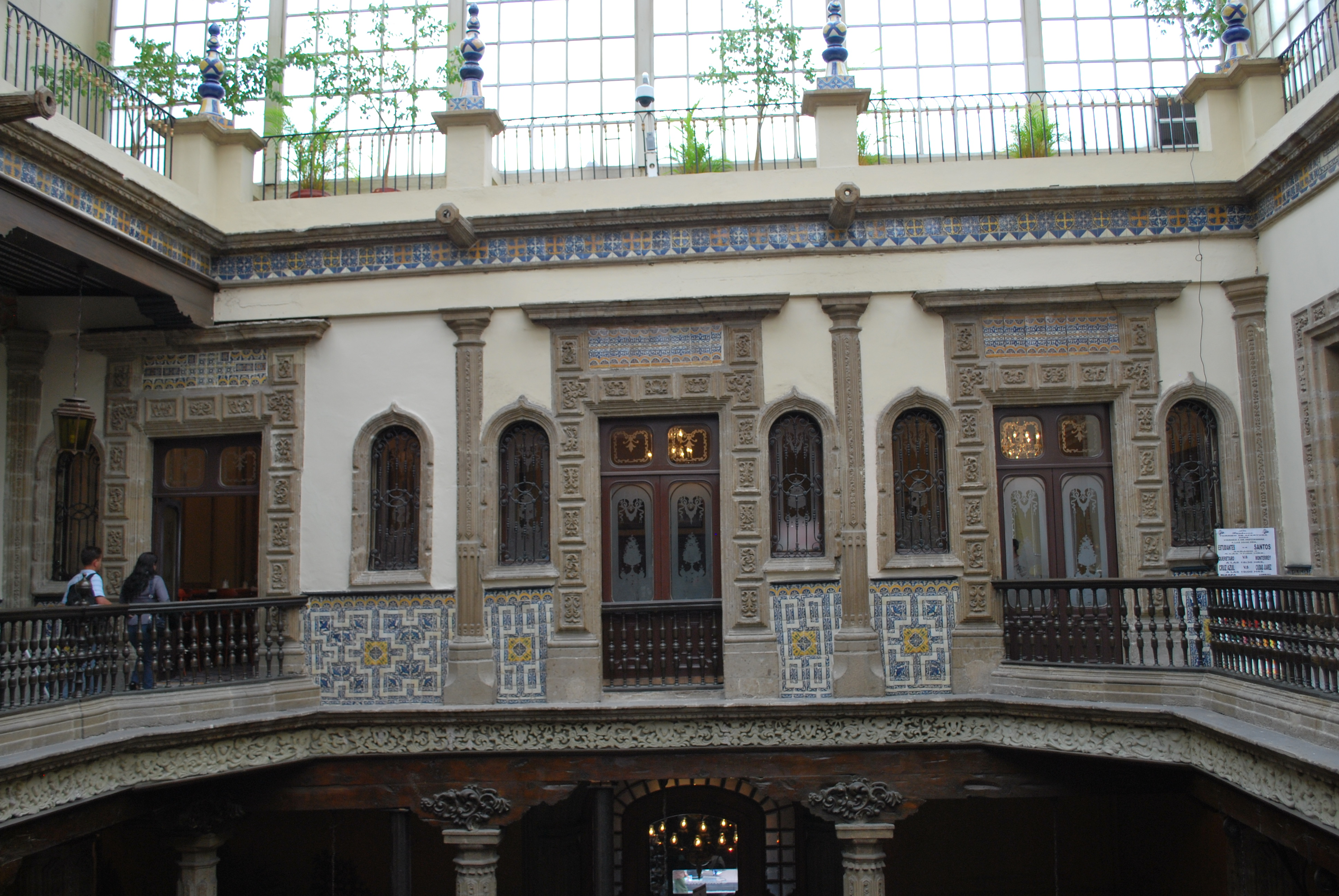
Upper floor with doors

The Counts of the Valley de Orizaba sold the house to attorney Martinez de la Torre in 1871. Upon Torre's death, the de Yturbe Idaroff family moved in, the last to keep the building as a private residence. Near the end of the 19th century, the house lost 90 square meters on the north side, to make way for 5 de Mayo Street. In 1881, the top floor was rented to the Jockey Club, the most exclusive social club between 1880 and 1914, and the lower floor housed an exclusive women's clothing store until 1914. For a brief time afterwards one of its floors was used as a venue for the House of the World Worker. During the Mexican Revolution, the Zapatista Army occupied the building for a short time. In 1914, supporters of Porfirio Díaz held a banquet here in honor of Victoriano Huerta to celebrate the assassination of Francisco I. Madero after the Decena Trágica. An indignant Venustiano Carranza then seized the property in 1915, holding it for a number of months. The original owner, Francisco-Sergio de Yturbe managed to regain possession of the house before government-hired workers were able to finish remodeling it.

== Sanborns ==
Early in the 20th century, Frank Sanborn and his brother Walter opened a small soda fountain/drugstore on Filomeno Mata Street in the historic center of Mexico City, calling it Sanborns American Pharmacy In 1917, the two brothers saw the old mansion as a place to expand their business. They took two years to remodel it, putting a stained-glass roof over the main courtyard, putting in new floors and adding a peacock mural by Romanian painter Pacologue. A less important mural was painted by José Clemente Orozco in 1925 called Omnisciencia, solicited by his friend Francisco-Sergio (Paco) de Yturbe with the approval of the Sanborns brothers. A restaurant covered the inner courtyard and now dominates the establishment, which now is the flagship site for a chain of restaurants called Sanborns. The building was declared a national monument in 1931. Since the early 20th century, this Sanborns has been a popular place to have a meal in luxurious surroundings. The business has hosted painters, writers, actors, poets and revolutionaries. It was a symbol of a cosmopolitan atmosphere in the first half of the 20th century. The building was restored again between 1993 and 1995 after suffering a minor fire on the second floor. This project was aimed at preserving the elements of the building dating from the Baroque period, the French and Art Nouveau elements of the late 19th and early 20th centuries, as well as the two murals, which had deteriorated considerably. Sanborns currently belongs to billionaire Carlos Slim.

== Gallery ==
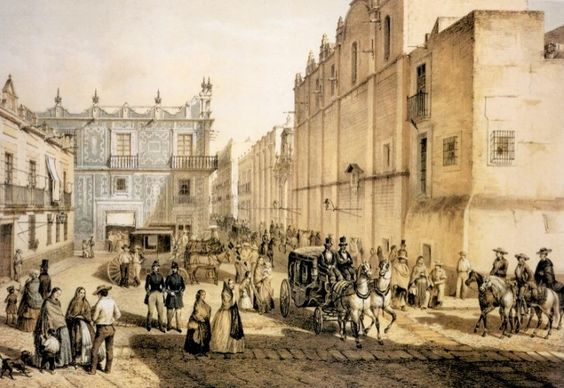
Plazuela de Guardiola in 1855 by Casimiro Castro. Museo Nacional de Arte. Casa de los Azulejos is at center.

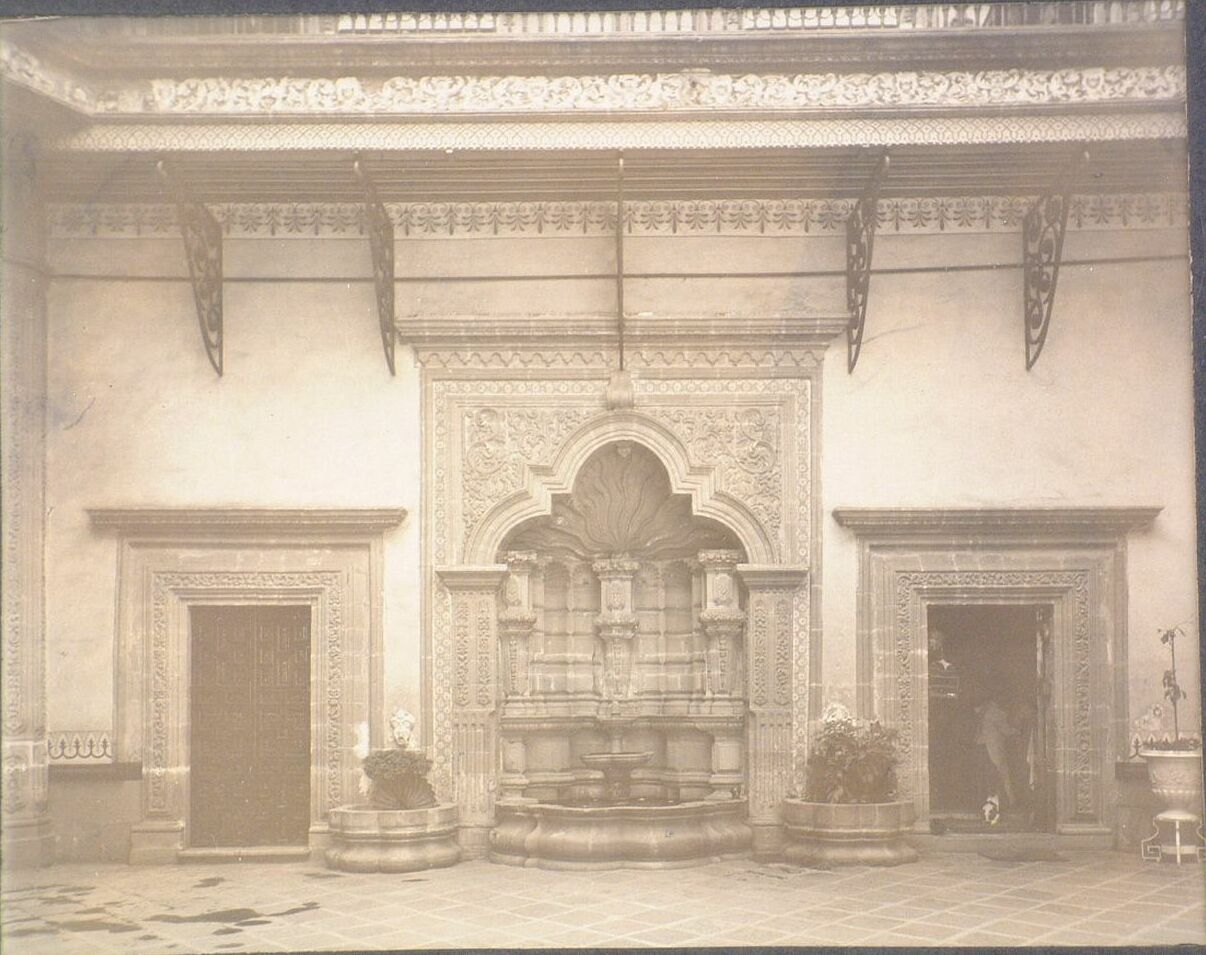
Colonial fountain in the patio of the Casa de los Azulejos. Photo of 1901. Photographed by Henry G. Peabody

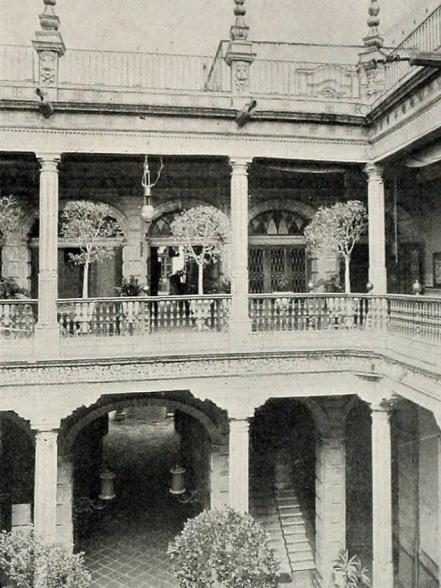
Cloister of Casa de los Azulejos in 1897.

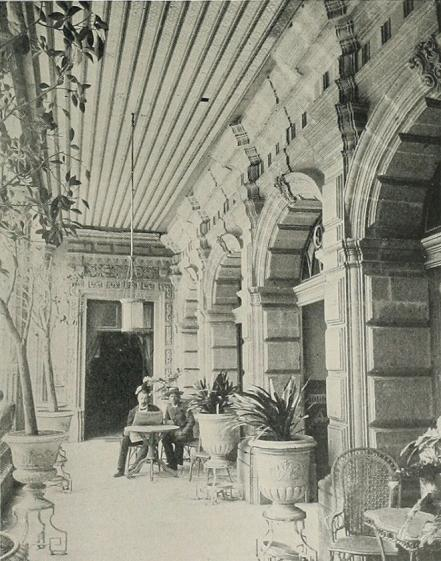
Interior of Casa de los Azulejos in 1897.

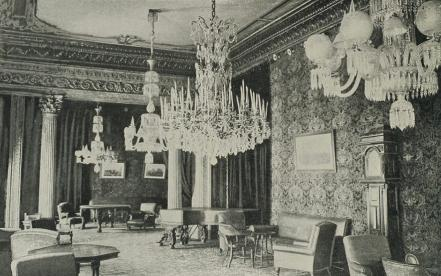
Interior of Casa de los Azulejos in 1897.

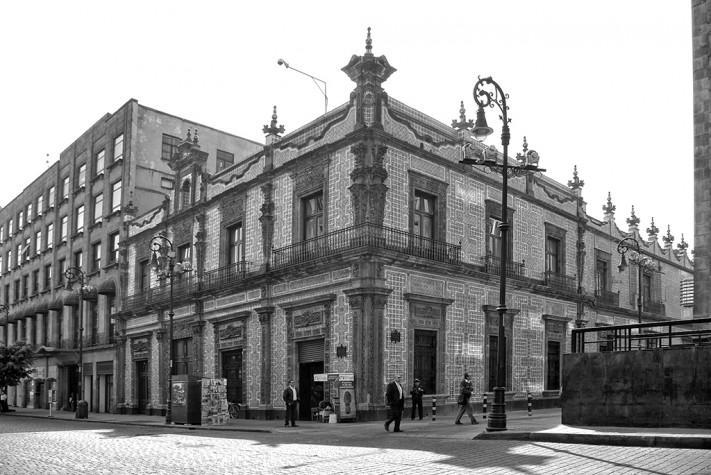
Casa de los Azulejos in 1897.

== See also ==
- Talavera pottery
- Azulejo
