= Madero Street =

Pedestrian street in Mexico City

Coordinates: 19.433617°N 99.137296°W

Francisco I. Madero Avenue
- Calle Madero (Madero Street)
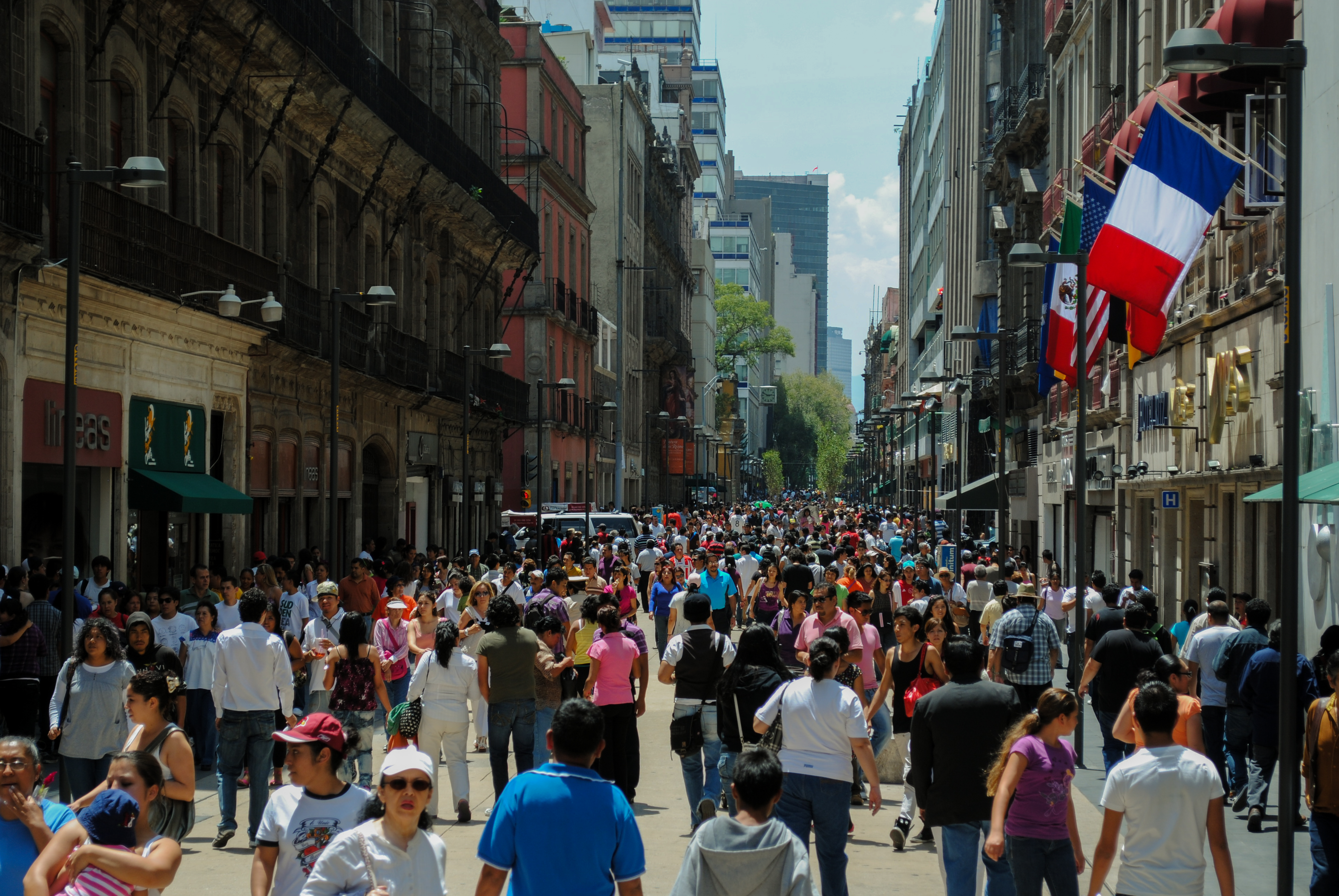
- Calle Madero; The Torre Latinoamericana in the background
- Interactive map of Francisco I. Madero Avenue
- Former names: Calle de La Profesa, Calle de San Francisco, Paseo de Plateros
- Namesake: Francisco I. Madero
- Type: Pedestrian
- Length: 700 m (2,300 ft)
- Location: Historic center of Mexico City
- Postal code: 06000
- Nearest metro station: Allende, Bellas Artes, San Juan de Letrán, Zócalo
- East end: Zócalo (Constitution Square)
- West end: Eje Central

Construction
- Inauguration: 1862

Francisco I. Madero Avenue, commonly known as simply Madero Street, is a geographically and historically significant pedestrian street of Mexico City and a major thoroughfare of the historic city center. It has an east–west orientation from Zócalo to the Eje Central. From that point the street is called Avenida Juárez and becomes accessible to one-way traffic from one of the city's main boulevards, the Paseo de la Reforma.

It was named in honour of one of the most important figures in the Mexican Revolution – Francisco I. Madero, a leader of the Anti-Re-election Movement and who was briefly President of Mexico before his assassination in 1913.

== Description ==
This street has always been one of the most popular and busiest roads since colonial times and was designed by Spaniard Alonso Garcia Bravo. It was one of the first streets to be drawn of the new Spanish city on the ruins of the Aztec capital Tenochtitlan.

In the nineteenth century, Madero was already one of the most popular and crowded streets of the capital. In many buildings concurred popular sites like the Casa de los Azulejos, home of the famous Jockey Club or imported products stores, some of which exist until today as the "Pastelería El Globo" (El Globo Pastry) and "Sombreros Tardán" (Tardán Hats). Another famous store was "Droguería Plateros" (Plateros Drugstore) at 9 Second Street of Plateros. In its upper part, Ferdinand Bon Benard and Gabriel Veyre, dealers of Lumiere Brothers, gave on August 14, 1896 the first cinema show in Mexico.

There are chronicles about the popularity of the Madero street as a social point of meeting written by José Joaquín Fernández de Lizardi, Guillermo Prieto, Manuel Gutiérrez Nájera and Luis G. Urbina, among others.

=== Names ===
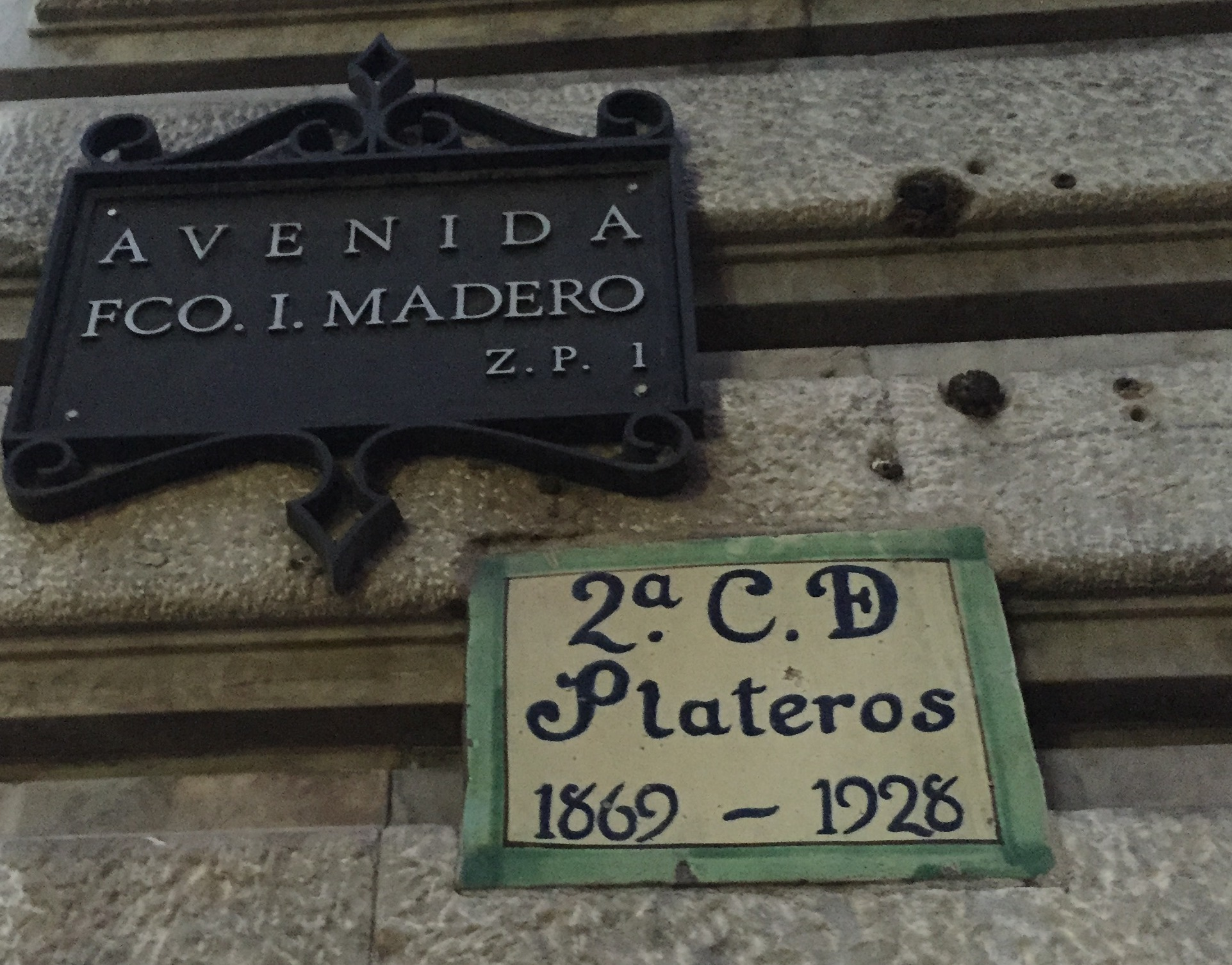
Modern street sign and plaque with the former name of the section, Calle de Plateros.

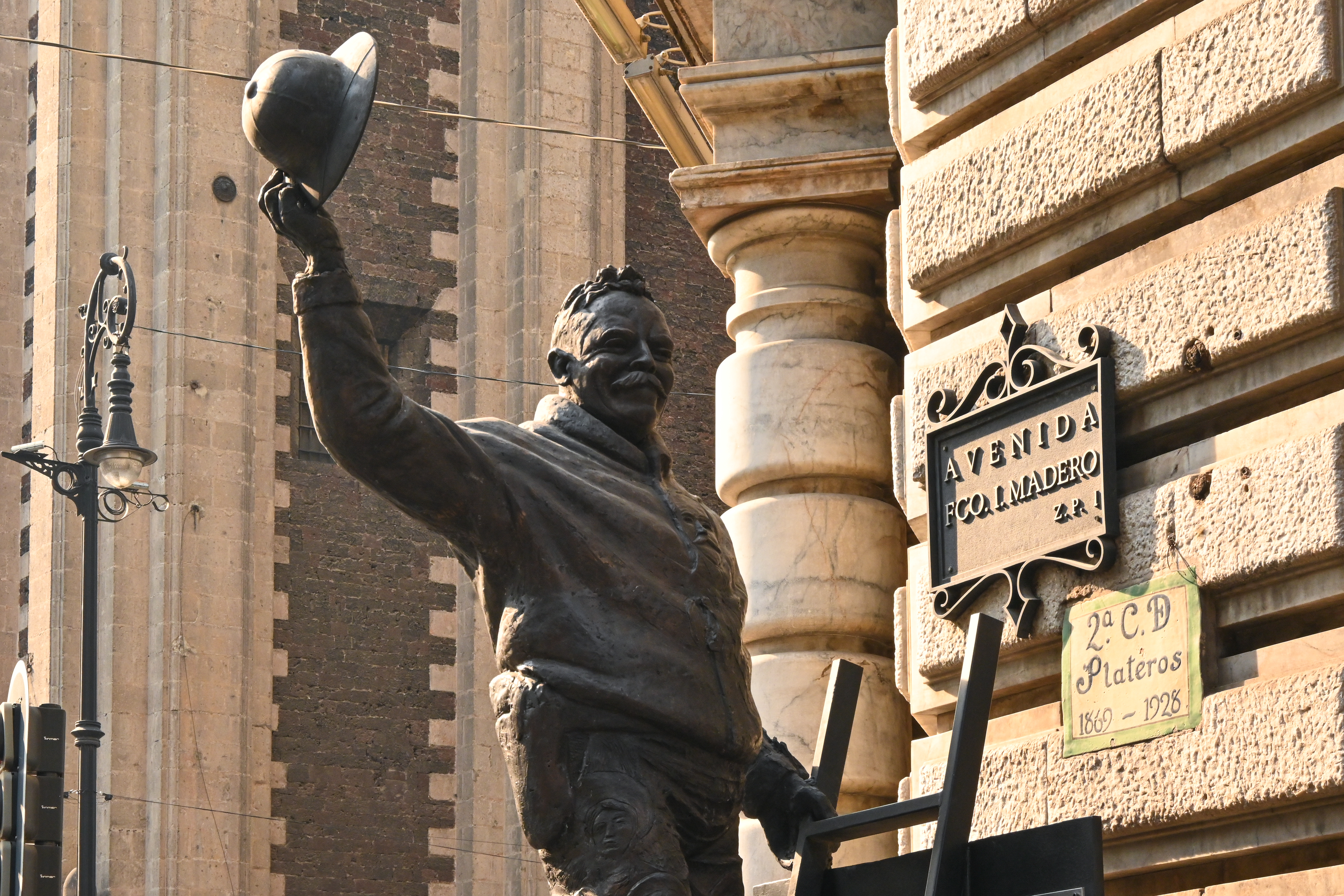
Commemorative sculpture of Pancho Villa placing the sign that renamed the street on December 8, 1914.

Three sections of the street have each had previous names. The Western half of the street, between the current Eje Central Lázar Cárdenas (named San Juan de Letrán street at the time) and Bolívar street, was called "First and Second Street of San Francisco" after the large church and monastery complex at that location. Further East, between Bolívar street and Isabel la Católica street, was known as "Profesa street" after the Temple of San Felipe Neri (commonly known as "La Profesa") which is located there. Finally, the section between Isabel la Católica street and Zócalo (Constitution Square) was known as "Calle de Plateros" (Silversmith's road) after the silver jewellery workshops and stores established in that block after an ordinance given by the viceroy Lope Díez de Armendáriz, in the seventeenth century.

The present name was bestowed by Francisco "Pancho" Villa on the morning of December 8, 1914, after the arrival of his troops and Zapata's Liberation Army of the South to Mexico City. Villa and a small group of troops placed a plaque with the new street name on the corner of Madero and Isabel la Católica streets. They announced that whoever removed the plate would be shot.

=== Pedestrianisation ===
On that street, in just four blocks, is the entire history of the country

— Ilan Semo, historian

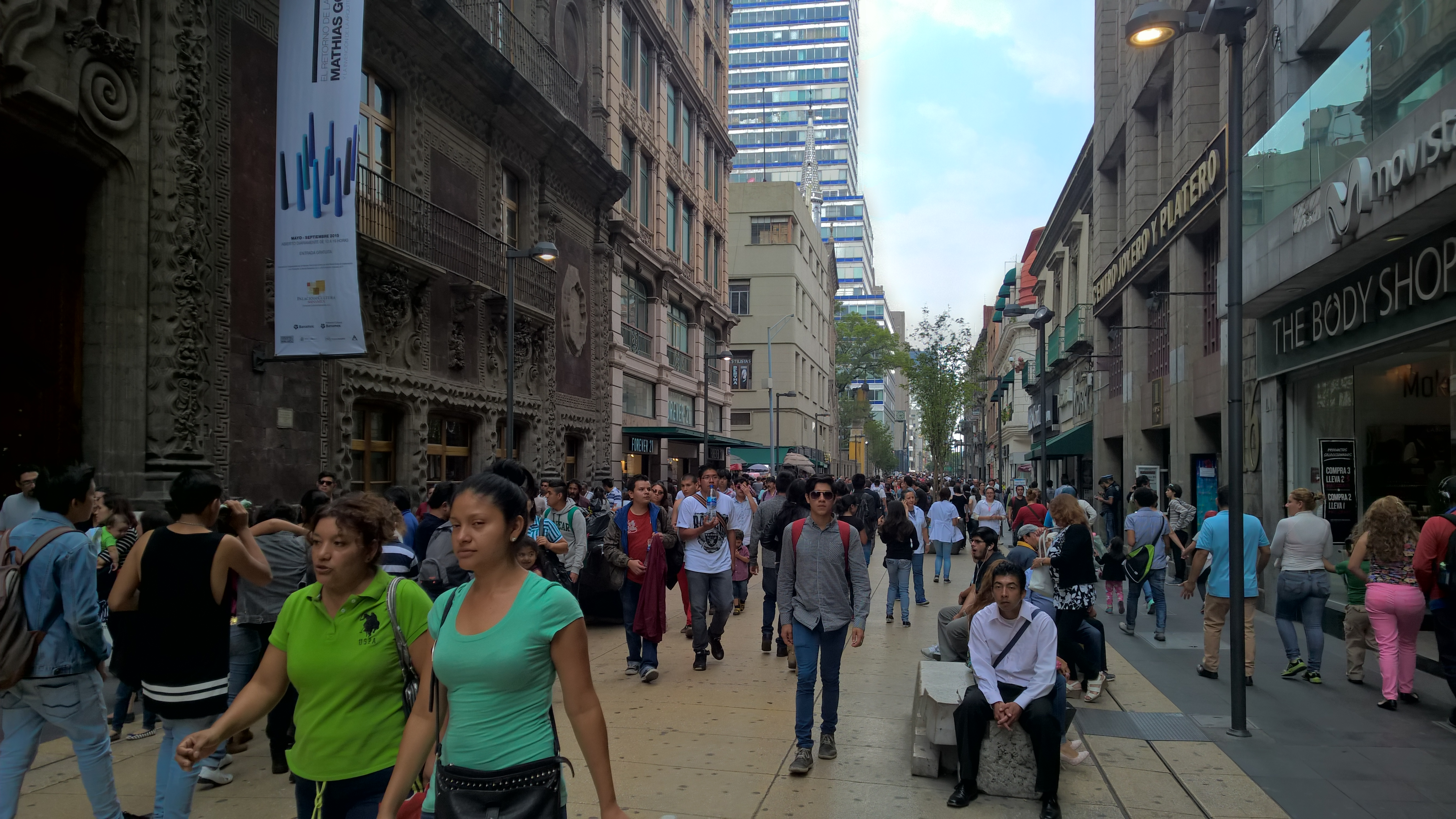
Francisco I. Madero Avenue

In 2009 Alejandra Moreno, the coordinator of the Historical Center Authority, announced that the city government would pedestrianise the street. Though resisted by shop owners at the time, the change has been a success with the street being very crowded with pedestrians and increases in real-estate value for landholders. In 2012 the modifications were awarded by the VIII Iberoamerican Biennial of Architecture and Urbanism (BIAU) for best architectural and urban development.

== Notable buildings ==
The centrality of the street, both geographically and culturally, has meant it has always been a site of mansions, churches and important buildings.

From West to East these include:

- The Torre Latinoamericana, a skyscraper at the Western end of the street, the city's tallest building at the time of its construction in 1956
- The Casa de los Azulejos (House of Tiles), the house of the Condesa del Valle de Orizaba, now the flagship of the Sanborns restaurant chain.
- The Church of San Francisco, the third church by this name on the site, and all that remains of a large monastery complex.
- The National Church of Philip of Jesus ^{(Sp)}
- The Casa del Marqués de Jaral de Berrio, now known as Palace of Iturbide, which became hotel after being the home of Agustin de Iturbide.
- The Borda House, home of José de la Borda.
- The Temple of San Felipe Neri "La Profesa", established by the Society of Jesus in the 16th century.
- The Museo del Estanquillo (Museum of the Little Shop) in the "La Esmeralda" building.
- The Old Portal de Mercaderes, a pair of commercial buildings on either side of the street at the entrance to the Zócalo.
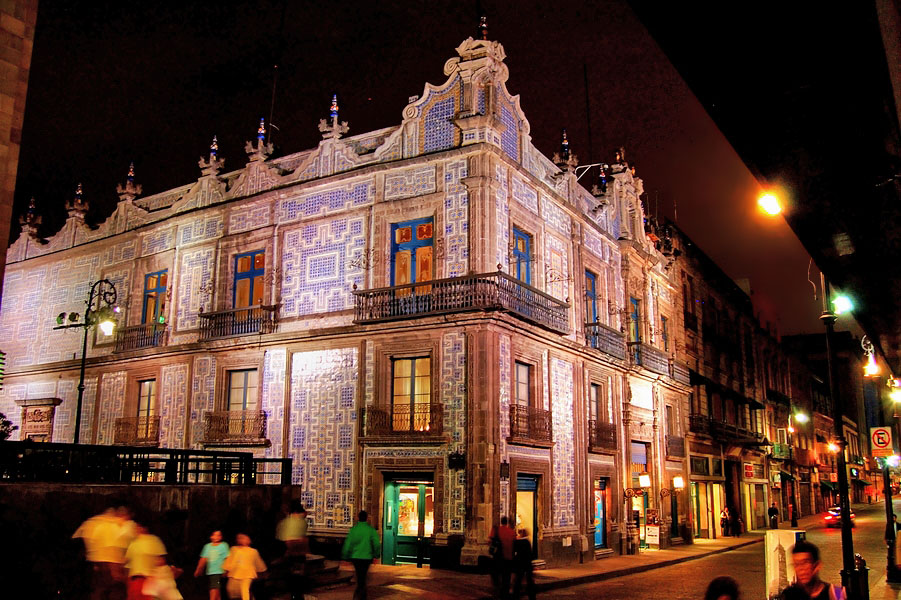
The House of Tiles (2007)

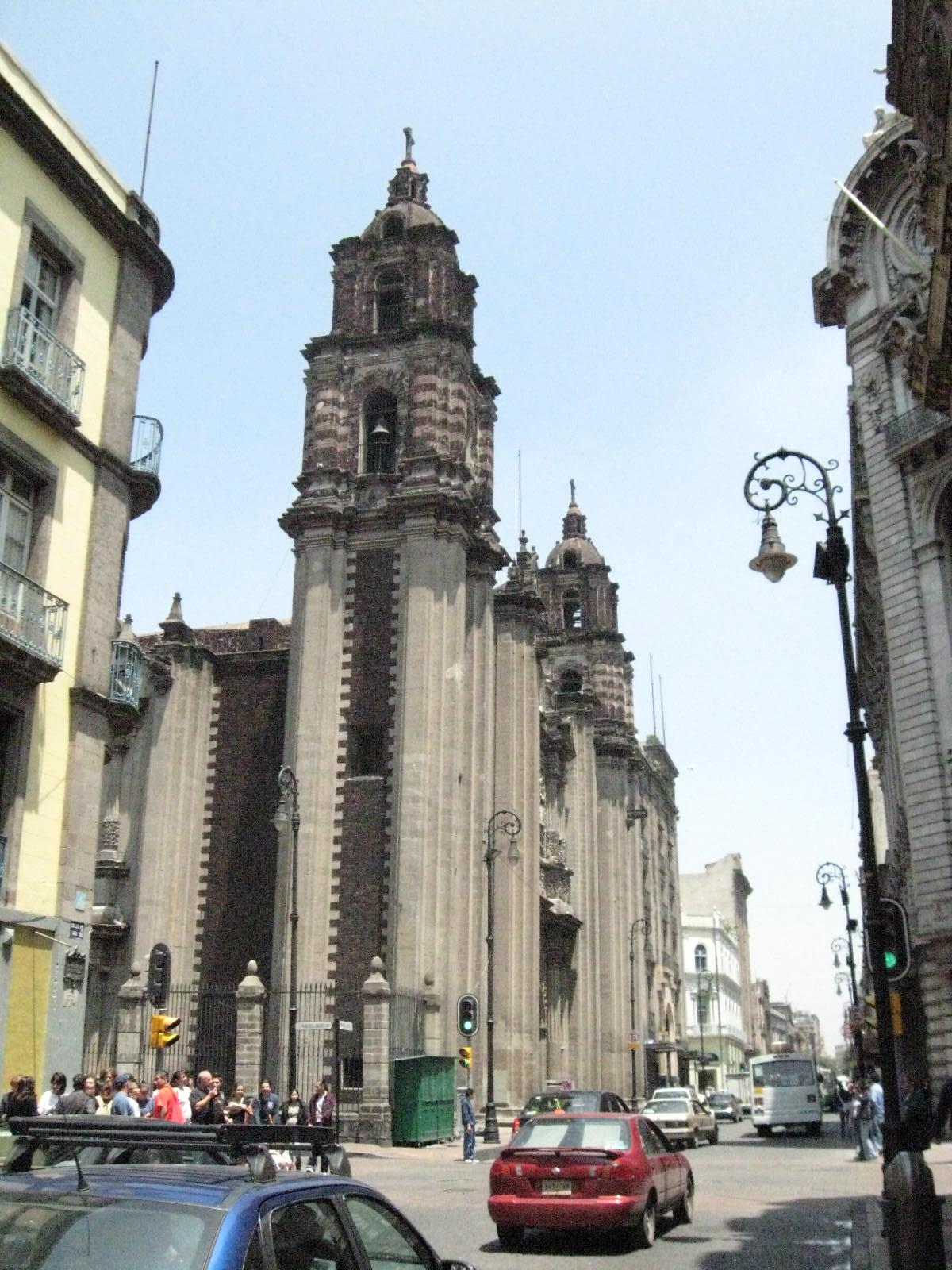
Temple of San Felipe Neri (2008)

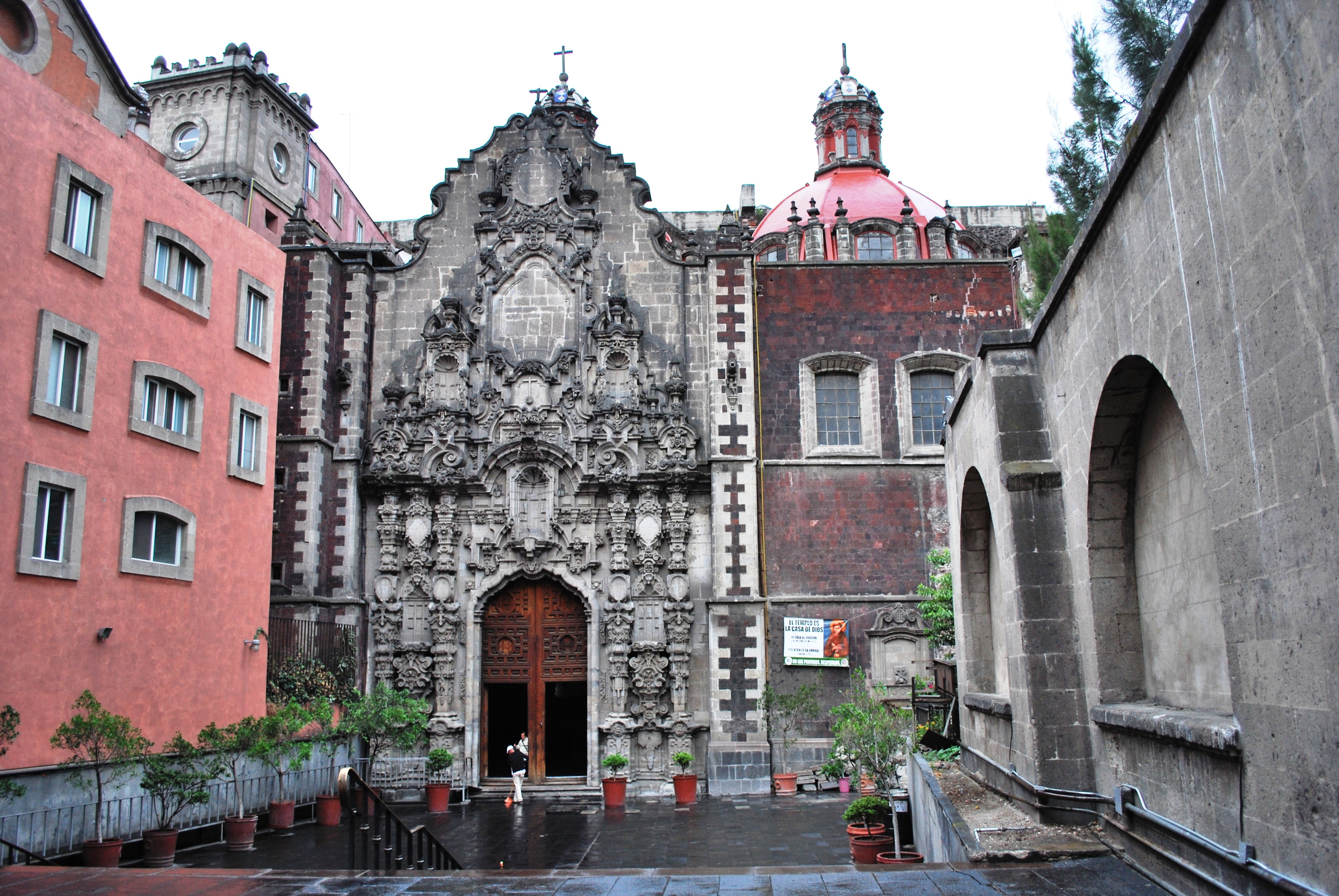
Facade of the San Francisco Church (2009)

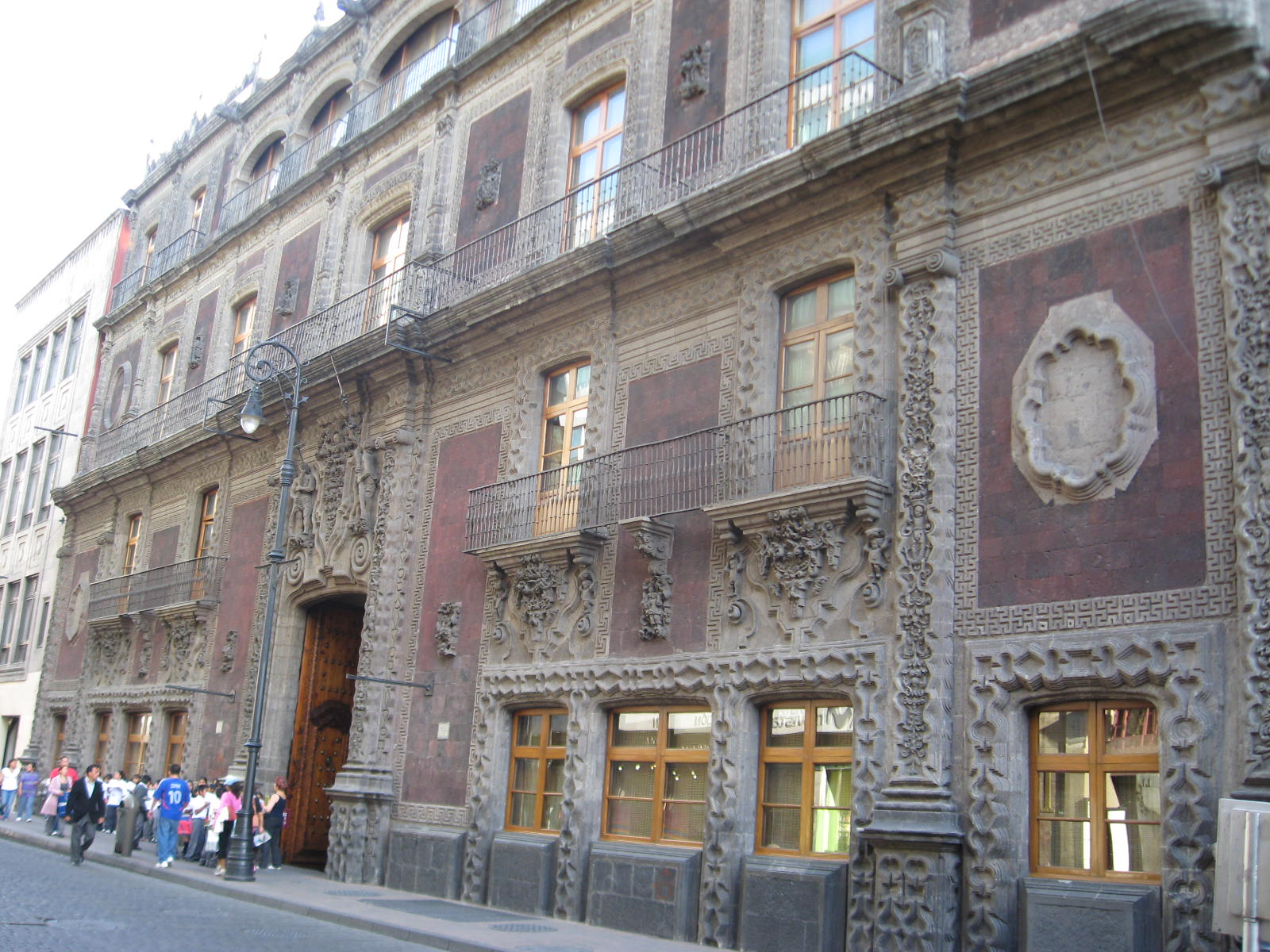
Palace of Iturbide (2009)
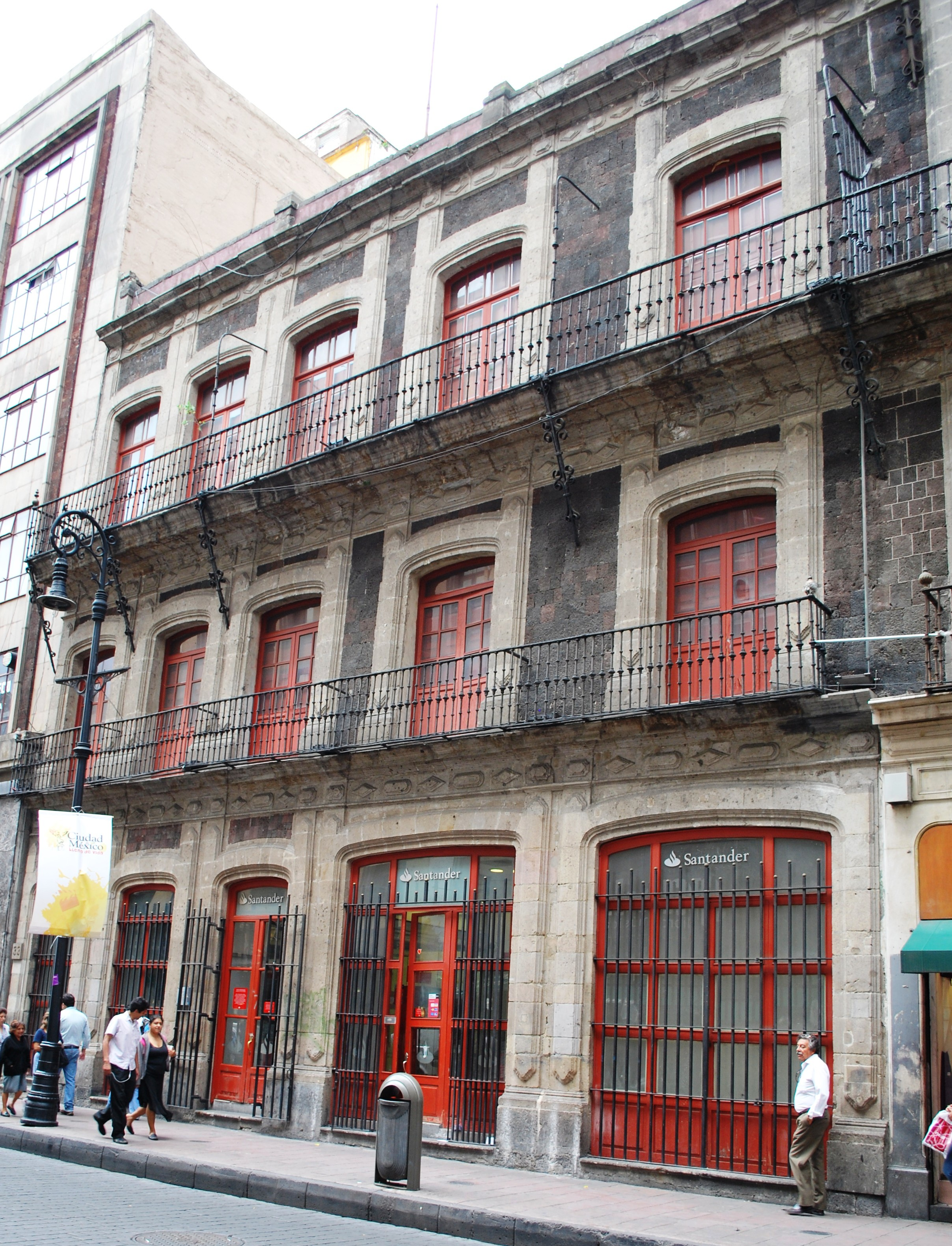
Borda house (2009)

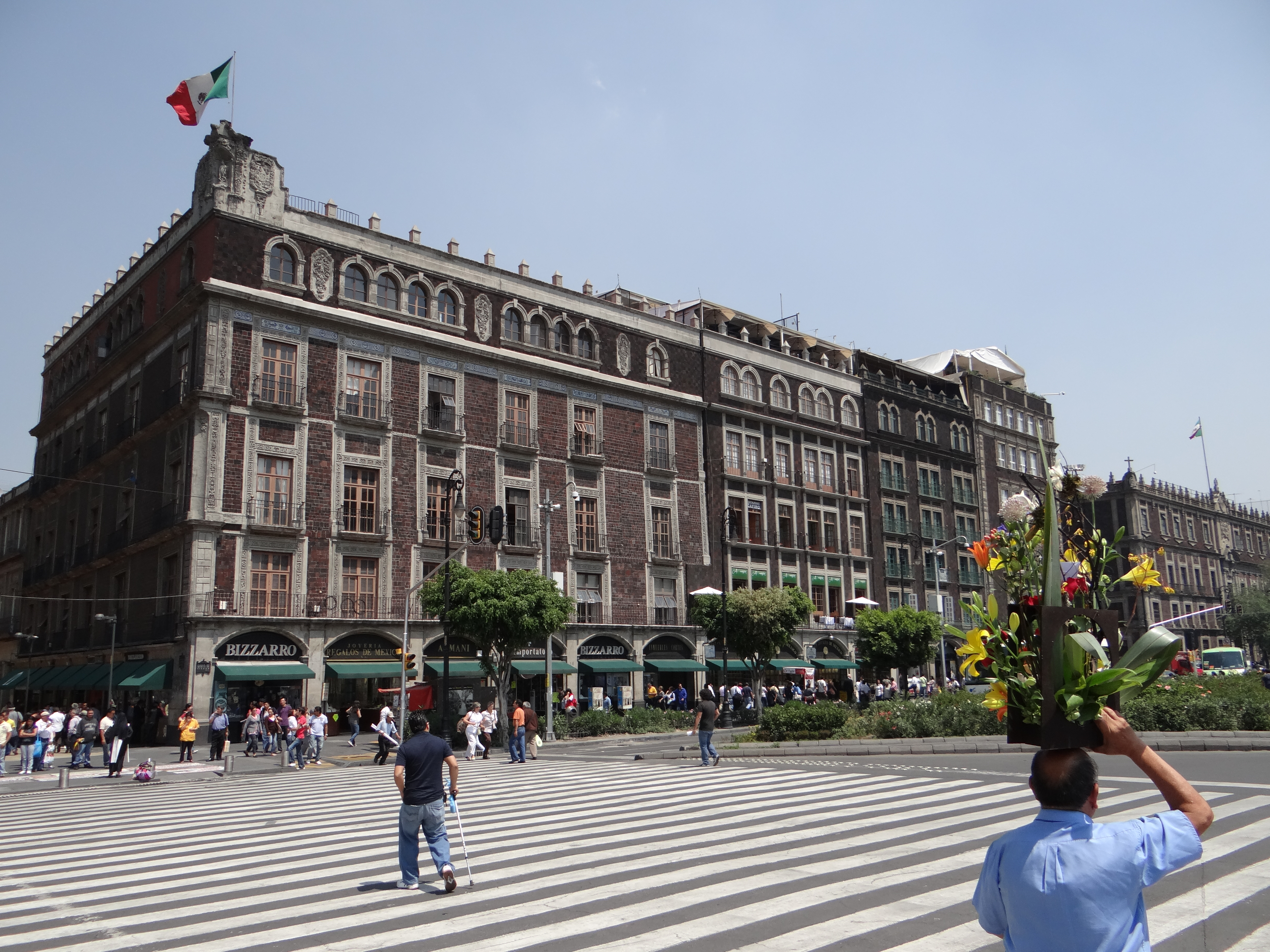
Old Portal de Mercaderes (2012)

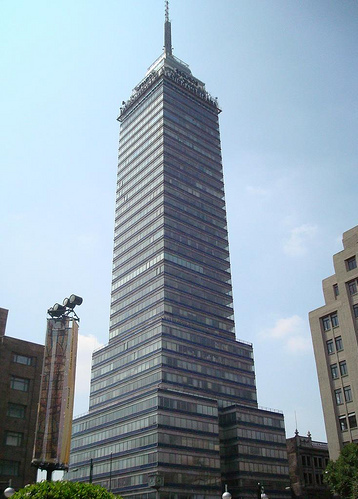
Torre Latinoameri-cana (2012)

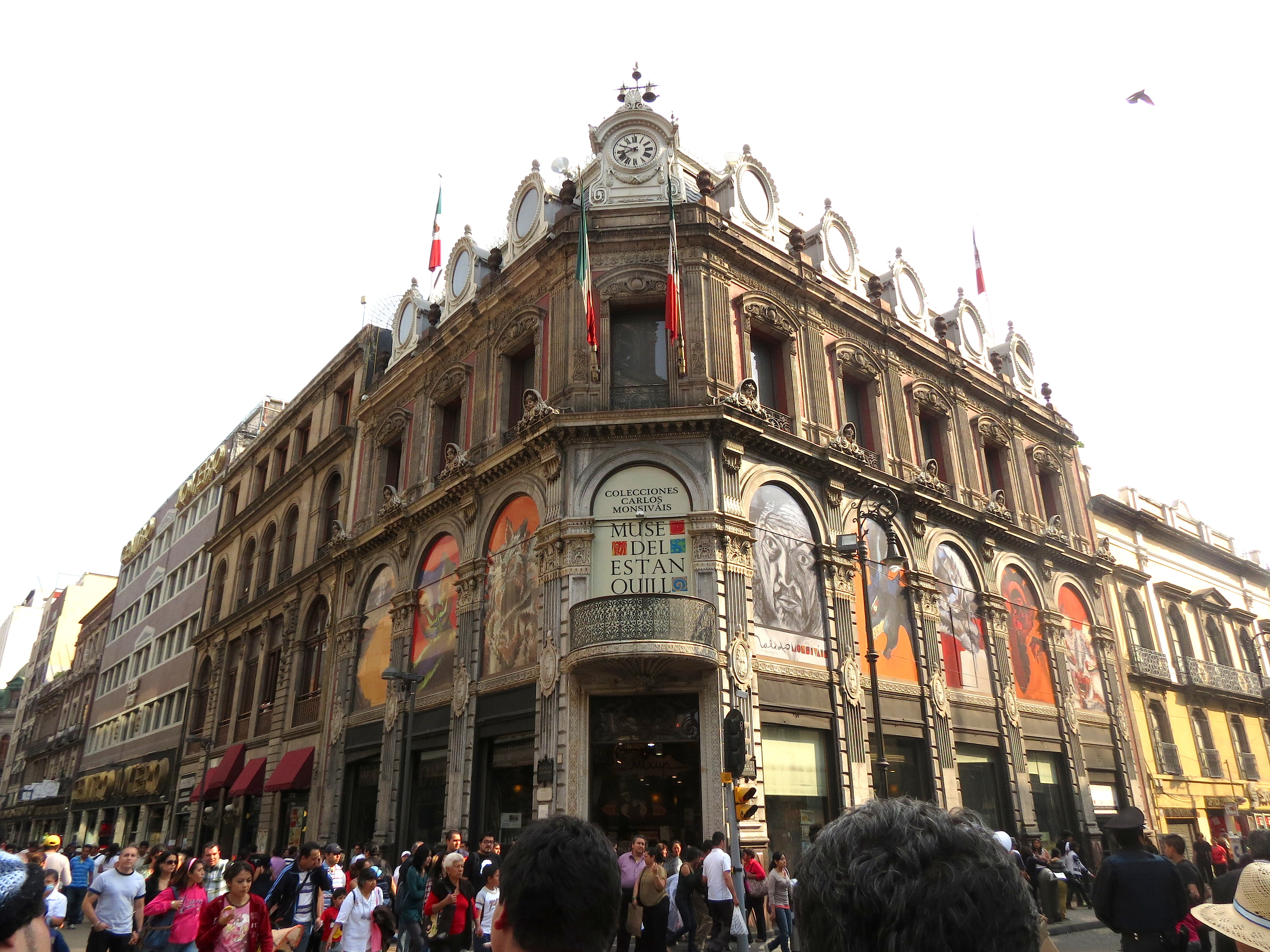
Museo del Estanquillo (2013)
