= Edificio Bolivia =

Office building in Mexico City

- Edificio Bolivia
- The María Isabel complex seen from Colonia Cuauhtémoc, 2010
- Alternative names: Edificio de oficinas Ford

General information
- Type: Office building
- Architectural style: Modernist
- Location: Colonia Cuauhtémoc, Cuauhtémoc, Paseo de la Reforma 333, at Río Tíber, Mexico City, Mexico
- Coordinates: 19.4280°N 99.1679°W
- Current tenants: Citibanamex, Shake Shack (ground floor)
- Year built: 1961–1963
- Renovated: 2001
- Cost: US$6 million
- Client: Antenor Patiño

Design and construction
- Architects: Juan Sordo Madaleno, José Villagrán García, José Adolfo Wiechers, Ricardo Legorreta

Renovating team
- Renovating firm: Pascal Arquitectos

The Edificio Bolivia is a modernist office building on Paseo de la Reforma in Mexico City, at the corner of Río Tíber, facing the Angel of Independence. It was the office half of a complex that the Bolivian tin heir Antenor Patiño built in the early 1960s around the Hotel María Isabel, designed by Juan Sordo Madaleno, José Villagrán García, José Adolfo Wiechers and Ricardo Legorreta. From the 1960s until 2003 it housed the Mexican headquarters of the Ford Motor Company, and architectural guides list it as the Ford office building.

== History ==
=== Site ===
The corner was once occupied by the house of George T. Braniff and Concepción Lascuráin, a three-storey mansion with a French-inspired façade built between 1912 and 1919. It served as the Brazilian embassy from 1936 to 1940, and the Braniff heirs put it up for sale after Concepción Lascuráin died in 1959.

=== The Patiño complex ===
Patiño, whose father Simón I. Patiño had been known as the "tin king", began investing in Mexico in the mid-1950s. The historian Carlos Tello Díaz links this to Patiño's divorce: President Adolfo Ruiz Cortines offered his support in the case if Patiño made "a good investment in Mexico". Tello Díaz dates the start of work on the hotel to 1956. Around 1960 Patiño bought the Braniff property, added it to his lots facing Reforma, Tíber, Volga and Danubio, and had the house demolished.

The hotel, named after Patiño's daughter María Isabel, was described in February 1962 as about to open after "three years in construction". The office building opened a few months after the hotel, according to Rafael Fierro Gossman. Noelle and Tejeda's guide dates the complex to 1961–1963, and the University of Guadalajara's biographical encyclopedia lists the "edificio Bolivia" among Villagrán García's works under 1963 and credits the office building to him, as do its later renovation architects. Herbert Weisskamp, in a 1968 survey of hotel design, gave its cost as US$6 million; the hotel had cost $20 million. According to the Ford historian David L. Lewis, the building owes its name to its Bolivian owner. (Note: Lewis attributes the name to "Simon Patino, the Bolivian tin king"; Simón I. Patiño died in 1947, and the building was developed by his son Antenor.)

=== Tenants ===
Ford moved its Mexican offices into the building during the 1960s; Fierro Gossman gives the year as 1965. The company still gave Paseo de la Reforma 333 as its address in the late 1990s, and Lewis called the building Ford of Mexico's "posh headquarters" in 1999. In 2003 Ford opened new corporate offices in Santa Fe.

At street level, Sanborns opened a branch on the corner in 1968. The company called it "Tíber"; to the public it was the "Sanborns del Ángel". It looked straight onto the monument where crowds gathered after football victories and for political rallies, and a columnist in La Lista remembered it as a meeting place for the city's gay community in the 1980s. The branch closed after the earthquake of September 2017. Two years later Shake Shack picked the corner for its first restaurant in Mexico, and a Citibanamex branch took the rest of the space.

== Architecture ==
Hotel and office building were laid out together on a raised plaza in front of the Angel of Independence, with ramps to an underground garage below it. Fierro Gossman notes that the office block was pulled back from the corner so that it would not compete with the monument. Noelle and Tejeda judged that the two buildings "combine successfully to form a pleasant raised plaza", with their glass curtain walls tying them together.

Villagrán García was the first Mexican architect to take up the rationalist vocabulary of the European avant-garde, and in his later career he designed office buildings and hotels. Noelle has placed the Hotel María Isabel, his collaboration with Sordo Madaleno and Legorreta, in a later phase in which his work drifted from the principles of his own architectural theory.

=== Renovations ===
Pascal Arquitectos remodelled the building in two stages, finishing in 2001. The firm extended the lower block toward Reforma, rebuilt the plaza, and re-clad the tower. A double skin of aluminium louvres and solar-control glass now covers the Reforma front, and on Río Tíber the original vertical façade gave way to horizontal bands of composite panels, with the old marble left in place behind them. The architects and the newspaper El Economista describe the building as catalogued by the Instituto Nacional de Bellas Artes.

== See also ==
- Sheraton Mexico City Maria Isabel Hotel
- Angel of Independence
