= Sanborns =

Mexican department store and restaurant chain

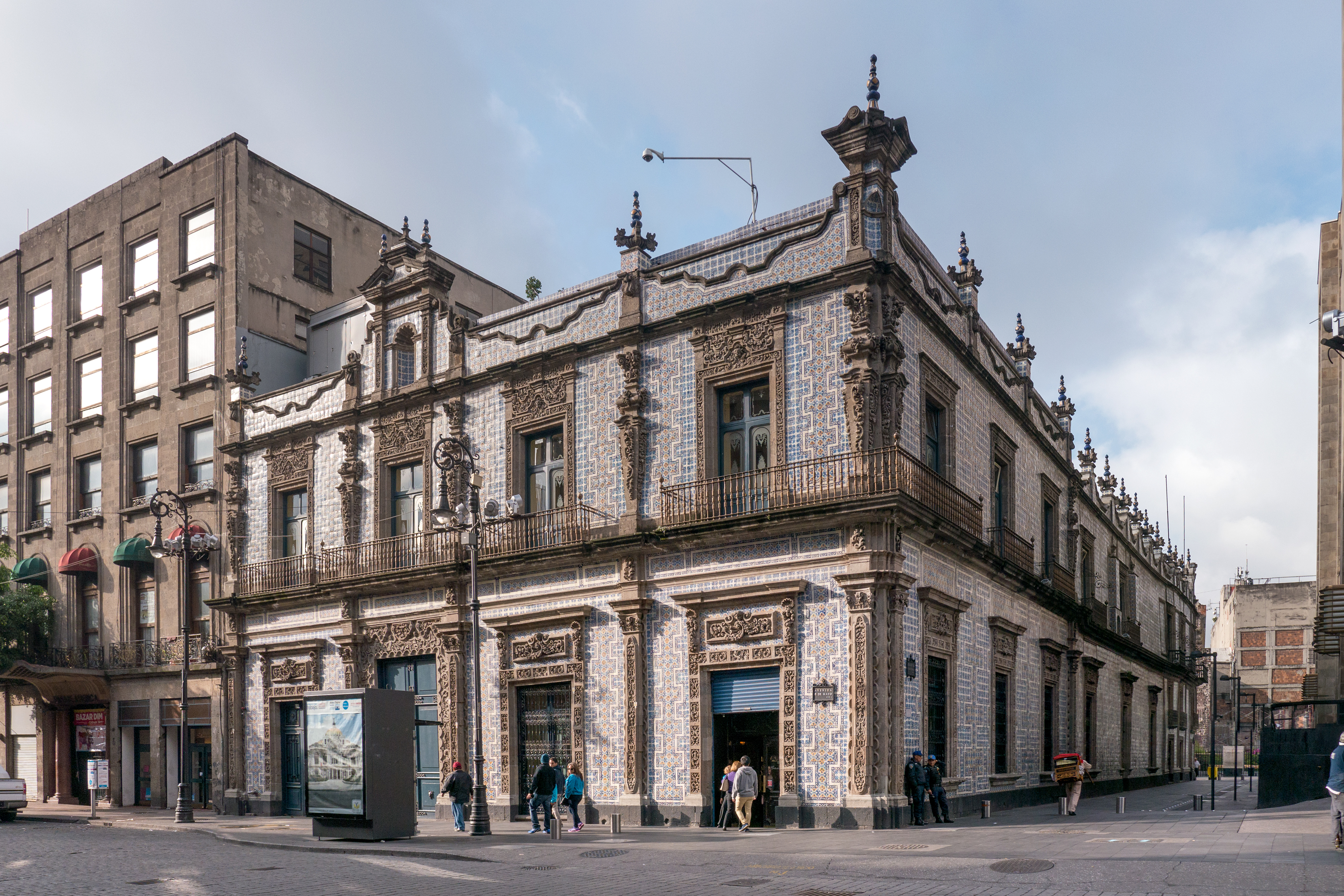
- The Casa de los Azulejos in Mexico City, home of the best-known Sanborns branch
- Type: Subsidiary
- Industry: Retail, restaurants
- Founded: 1903; 123 years ago in Mexico City
- Founders: Walter Sanborn; Frank Sanborn
- Headquarters: Mexico City, Mexico
- Number of locations: 141 (plus 14 Sanborns Café) (2025)
- Area served: Mexico
- Parent: Grupo Sanborns
- Website: www.sanborns.com.mx

Sanborns is a Mexican chain of stores that combine a restaurant with a junior department store. It was founded in Mexico City in 1903 by the American brothers Walter and Frank Sanborn, and its best-known branch occupies the 16th-century Casa de los Azulejos in the historic center. The Walgreen Company held a large minority stake and managed the chain from 1946 until 1984, after which control passed to Carlos Slim. It is part of Grupo Sanborns, in turn owned by Grupo Carso. At the end of 2025 there were 141 Sanborns stores and 14 Sanborns Café restaurants.

It began as an American-style drugstore with a soda fountain, became a meeting place for the capital's elite in the 1920s, and by the late 20th century was a national chain used by all social classes. The store appears often in Mexican novels, chronicles and film.

== History ==
=== Founding ===
A 1911 Sanborns advertisement in The Mexican Herald, listing stores on Avenida San Francisco and Avenida 16 de Septiembre and closing with the slogan "Meet me at the Fountain"

Walter Sanborn, a licensed pharmacist from California, moved to Mexico in 1898 and worked in a Mexico City apothecary before his brother Frank joined him. In September 1903 the brothers opened their own American-style drugstore, the Sanborns American Pharmacy, at 6 San Francisco Street (now Madero Street) near the Alameda; the business took the name Sanborn Hermanos (Sanborn Brothers) in 1907. The company dates its founding to June 19, 1903. The store competed with more than a hundred drugstores in the capital and sold imported US medicines and household goods, in some cases at lower prices than the German importers. A bicycle delivery service meant that customers did not have to wait for their prescriptions.

In April 1910 the store imported a soda fountain from the United States and placed it in the middle of the shop, so that people coming in for a prescription had to walk past the lunch counter. A 1910 advertisement in The Mexican Herald promoted it as the real thing and used the slogan "Meet Me at the Fountain". Some accounts call it the first soda fountain in the country, and the drugstore grew into a restaurant. The claim that Sanborns brought the first soda fountain to Mexico is not correct, however: the Café París, across from the future Casa de los Azulejos, opened in 1900 with an ice cream parlor, soda fountain and American-style bar. Another popular story, that Porfirio Díaz and his wife were regular customers, is considered very unlikely by Chrisman, since Díaz left the country in 1911.

Early branches were on what is now Madero Street and on 16 de Septiembre street, and the brothers also opened a store in Tampico. A second branch opened on 16 de Septiembre Street in December 1910, and the Tampico store in January 1913. A 1914 annex at San Francisco 12 added a tearoom and candy shop.

The company's trademark of three owls is said to represent Frank Sanborn and his sons, Francis and Jonathan.

=== Mexican Revolution ===
During the Mexican Revolution Sanborns had trouble getting supplies, and in 1914 Frank Sanborn bought German-made Bayer products, including 5,000 tubes of aspirin, to keep the shelves stocked. He wrote that the wealthy customers of the Porfirian years had stopped coming. The store was damaged by soldiers in 1914 but stayed open as neutral ground. The American historian Michael Scully described it as a "citadel of neutral respectability", and a November 1914 ad told readers to "Cheer up!"

After the entry of the Zapata and Villista armies into the capital on December 6, 1914, a photographer of the Casasola archive took pictures of Zapata soldiers and officers having coffee and pan dulce (breakfast pastries) at a Sanborns. The photographs are among the best-known images of the Mexican Revolution in the capital, and are sold as postcards. They were not taken in the Casa de los Azulejos, as is often said, since Sanborns did not move there until 1919. Chrisman places them at the Calle San Francisco (now Madero), #12 branch and points out that newspapers repeated the mistake about the Casa. He reads the visit as a challenge to a place that had been reserved for the Porfirian elite. One of the photographs shows Sanborns waitresses serving the Zapatista soldiers. Troops of Zapata used the Sanborns branch on the site of today's Librería Madero as a meeting place, and photographs show Zapatista soldiers eating at its lunch counter. Another photograph shows the generals Feliciano Polanco Araujo and Teodoro Rodríguez at Sanborns on Plateros (now also part of Madero) Street.

==== Jack Johnson incident ====
On April 10, 1919, a waitress told the exiled American boxer Jack Johnson that Walter Sanborn had ordered her not to serve him. Johnson came back with armed Carrancista (Carranza-allied) officers and a crowd, General Federico Montes confronted Sanborn, and Sanborn apologized. The Mexico City municipal president fined the store 500 pesos on April 11, but on April 16 the government changed the stated reason to operating a drugstore without a license, and the fine was canceled after Sanborn appealed on April 21–22. Chrisman thinks Sanborn used political connections, although he says this is an inference.

=== Casa de los Azulejos ===
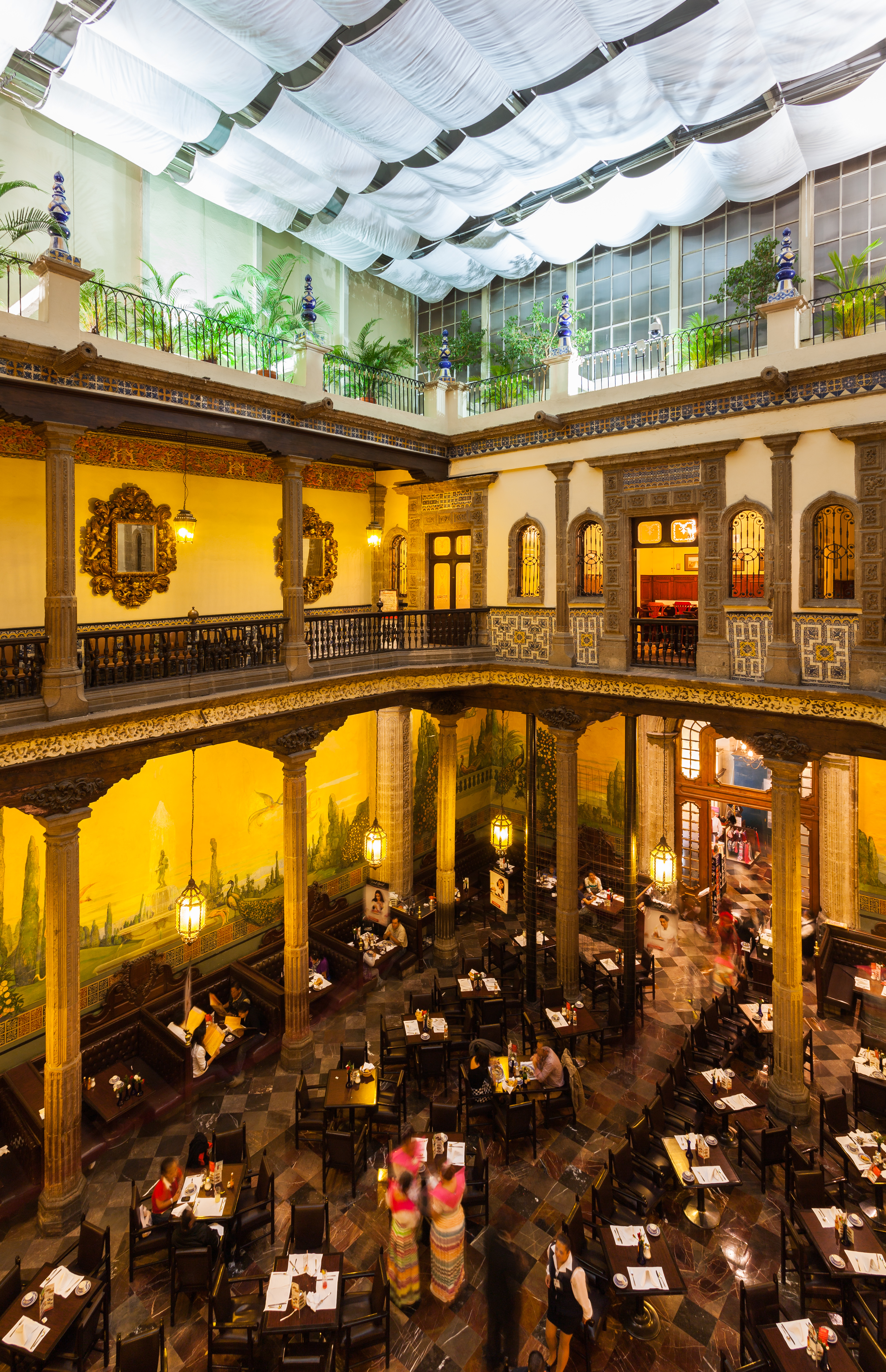
Interior of the Sanborns in the Casa de los Azulejos

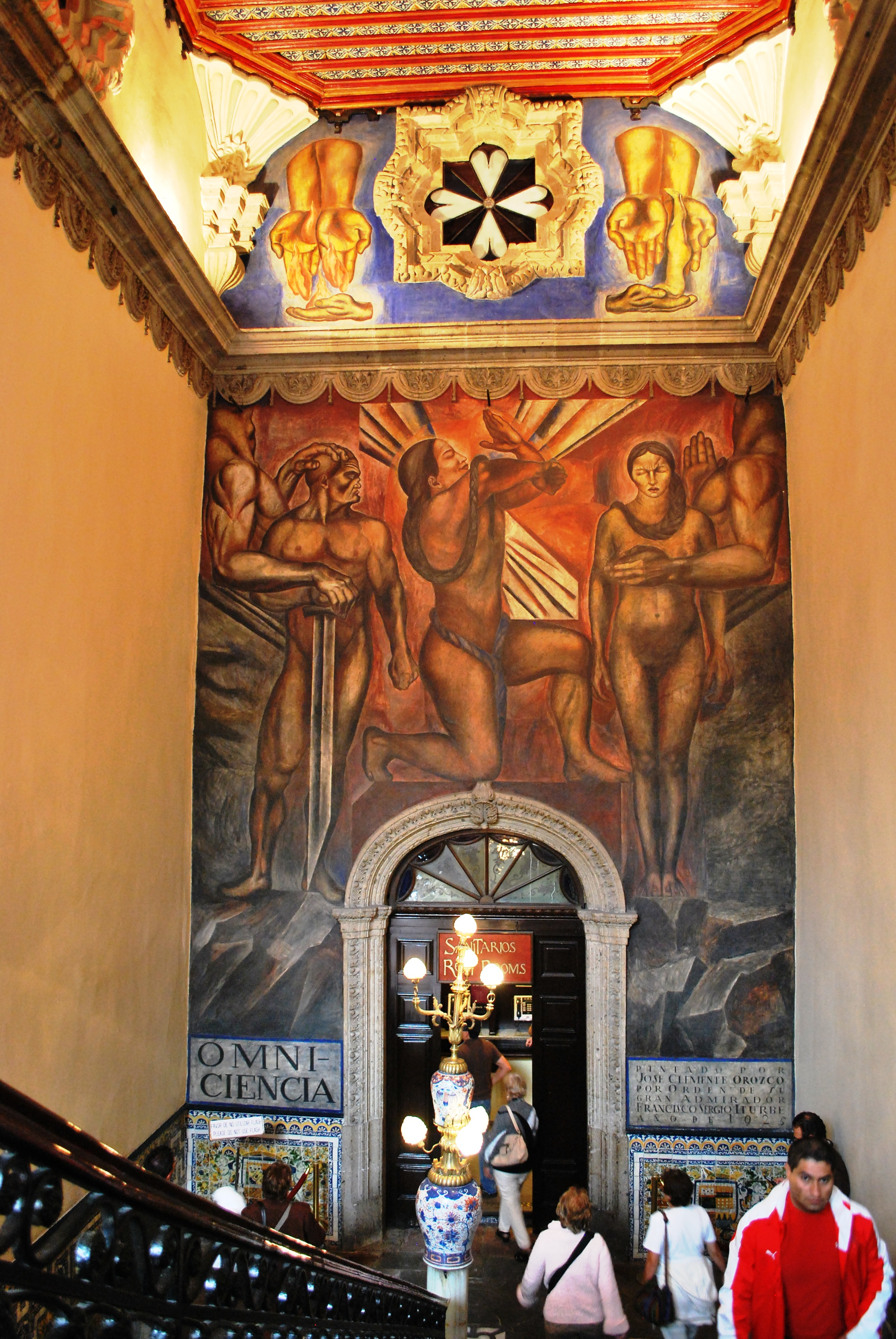
José Clemente Orozco's mural Omnisciencia (1925) on the main staircase

Sanborns signed a 20-year lease for the Casa de los Azulejos (House of Tiles) with its owners, the Iturbe family, in 1917, although another account dates the rental to January 1919. The colonial mansion, faced with Talavera tiles, had been the palace of the Counts of the Valle de Orizaba and then the home of the Jockey Club de México, an all-male elite club. In the fall of 1915 the Casa del Obrero Mundial, a labor federation, had occupied it for a short time, and then it stood empty. The plans of the Sanborn brothers included a glass roof over the patio, lower window sills and a new entrance on Avenida Cinco de Mayo, and the Association of Engineers and Architects objected to the changes.

After a restoration, the new store opened on October 11, 1919, with a drugstore, restaurant, tea room, soda fountain, candy counter and gift shop. Don Quijote wrote that the crowd could hardly get in, and El Heraldo de México estimated more than 6,000 visitors in one day. The former central courtyard became the main dining room, open from 7:30 am to 9:30 pm, and there was a second-floor tearoom and ballroom. The writer Salvador Novo made fun of the peacock paintings, the nurse-style uniforms of the waitresses, the glass ceiling and the chessboard floor in an article of 1924. The peacock murals upstairs are from the Jockey Club period. From the early 1920s Sanborns also sold silverwork, and by the early 1940s its silver sales reached $250,000 a year. Sanborns bought the building from the Iturbe family in 1978.

==== Omnisciencia ====
In 1925 José Clemente Orozco painted the mural Omnisciencia ("omniscience") on the stair landing. It was commissioned by the building's owner, the prominent Mexican art collector, patron and diplomat Francisco Sergio Iturbe, whom the art historian Xavier Moyssén Echeverría calls Orozco's friend and patron, and not by Sanborns, which was already a tenant and ran a restaurant in the building. The artist Dr. Atl described the building in 1927 as the "vieja Casa de los Azulejos, hoy Sanborn's" (the old Casa de los Azulejos, today Sanborn's). Moyssén concludes that the subject of the mural is the mystery of the origin of life.

On May 13, 1925, Dr. Atl wrote to Frank Sanborn to praise the mural and to propose a banquet for Orozco. A Sanborns manager turned it down two days later, saying Frank was in Europe and the United States on business. The writer Alejandro Puga says it was Walter who refused. By the 1940s the mural and the façade appeared together on a postcard.

=== Walgreen ownership ===
In 1946 Frank Sanborn sold the business. The published price was 13 million pesos (US$2.6 million), and the sale included the name, with Sanborn agreeing not to use it for another business; at the time the company had its Madero Street store in Mexico City and a branch in Monterrey. The Walgreen Company of Chicago bought jointly with a Mexico City investment bank, as Mexican law required majority Mexican ownership. Walgreen took about 23 percent of the shares for $613,000, with an option to raise its stake to about half, and ran the company under a management contract; most of the other shares were held by Mexican investors. It was Walgreen's first foreign acquisition. Time called Sanborns "the most famous American business in Mexico" at the time of the sale. Walgreen's stake was 47 percent by 1955 and 49 percent by 1966.

Under Walgreen the chain expanded beyond the historic center. A Sanborns café, the Café del Prado, opened in 1949, and branches on Paseo de la Reforma and on Lafragua street followed in 1954; (Note: Elsewhere in his thesis Chrisman gives 1953 for the opening of the Reforma branch.) the Lafragua branch, near the offices of the Chamber of Deputies, became a meeting place for politicians. The company also ran its own candy factory and a large restaurant in a Mexico City hotel. By 1966 it had seven stores in Mexico City and one in Monterrey, with annual sales of about $20 million. Sanborns opened in Acapulco in 1966 and in Puebla in 1969, when it had 12 outlets; it had 17 by 1971. In August 1976 it bought 80 percent of 18 Denny's restaurants in five Mexican cities, which were later converted to Sanborns Café, and it operated 44 outlets including those restaurants in 1980. Its main competitor in the same format, Vips, was started in 1964 at the Toreo by the Arango brothers, who also founded Aurrerá hypermarkets.

=== Grupo Carso ===
In August 1984 Walgreen sold its 46.9 percent stake for $30 million to a group of Mexican investors; the buyers included Carlos Slim's Grupo Carso, which held a majority of the shares by 1985. Slim has said the chain had about 30 stores when he took control. By 1995 there were 86 Sanborns and 35 Sanborns Café units, and the company had taken a majority interest in the music retailers Mix-Up and Discolandia. Chrisman counts 124 stores in 2003, and Expansión counts 176 in 2016. Sanborns is now one of several formats of Grupo Sanborns, Grupo Carso's retail division, alongside Sears, Dax, Mixup and iShop.

The chain expanded to Central America with a store at Multiplaza in Panama City, which opened in 2007 at a cost of US$6 million and closed in January 2020 after falling sales. Its two stores in San Salvador, at Metrocentro and Multiplaza, closed later that year.

=== Decline and closures ===
The decline began before the COVID-19 pandemic. In Mexico the number of Sanborns stores fell slightly from 169 in 2013 to 167 in 2018, while analysts pointed to competition from other department stores and restaurants. The Sanborns format's share of the group's sales fell from nearly 32% in 2012 to 25% in 2017. Sales fell 25.7% in 2020, and in 2022 had still not returned to their pre-pandemic level. In 2022 the business writer René Lankenau described the group's results as stagnant, with other chains growing faster and the restaurant crowd mostly older.

Several well-known branches in Mexico City closed in these years. Lafragua closed in 2018 and San Ángel in 2020; Carlos Slim later attributed both closures to high rents. In the Roma and Condesa area, the Hipódromo store closed in 2020, and in the Historic Center, Casa Boker and a store on Isabel la Católica closed in 2024. In 2025 the company closed two Sanborns Café restaurants in Mexico City, on Parque Vía and on Tabasco Street in Roma, as part of what it called a rationalization of stores.

Slim blamed rents for some of the closures. Of the San Ángel store he said "Nos querían doblar la renta y no había estacionamiento" (They wanted to double the rent and there was no parking), and he said the chain intended to open more stores. By Expansión's count the number of branches went from 176 in 2016 to 140 in 2024. The number of Sanborns stores rose by one in 2025, to 141, while Sanborns Café fell from 17 to 14. In 2026 Grupo Carso said it would open fewer stores and invest in online sales.

== Format ==
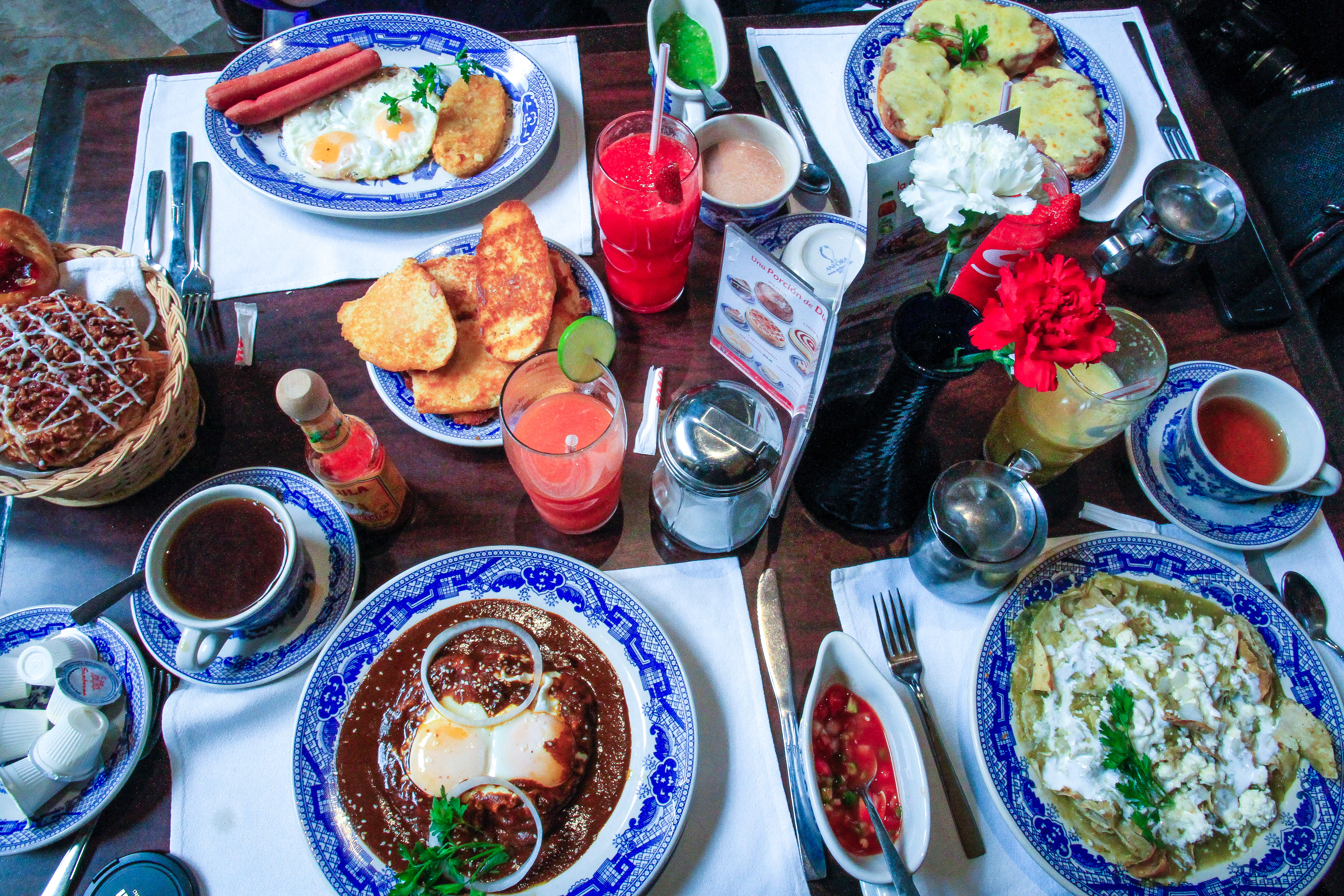
A meal at the Sanborns in the Casa de los Azulejos

The chain began as a transplant of the American drugstore soda fountain and coffee shop (diner) to Mexico City. By the 1940s the Madero Street store combined a restaurant, soda fountain, drugstore, men's clothing and souvenirs, and had long been a favorite of American visitors. In his 1946 chronicle Nueva grandeza mexicana, Salvador Novo described it as a place to eat or to buy toothpaste, a suit, silver, trinkets, paintings, sweets or laxatives.

=== Restaurant and food ===
Almost all Sanborns branches have a sit-down restaurant and usually a bar. Sanborns Café is a restaurant-only format.

==== Early menus ====
Chrisman's study of the menus shows an American and French restaurant that gradually took in Mexican dishes. The 1919–20 menus included "Chicken à la Sanborn" (chicken breast on ham with cream sauce), Chateaubriand, tournedos and a Mexican-American "Ol' Mammy Hash", while chicken tamales, at 40 cents, were the cheapest main dish. Desserts included the "Popocatepetl" (chocolate ice cream with raspberry syrup). A category of "Enchiladas Sanborn" appears in the early to mid 1920s, which according to Chrisman were not the later enchiladas suizas. A 1939 English-language menu has a "Mexican Dishes" section with enchiladas, chalupas with cream, rajas poblanas (rajas con crema), tacos and guacamole, and a "Mexican Dinner" for $2.25. The Motorists' Guide to Mexico of 1933 described the restaurant as American in style with "accents" of Mexican cooking.

==== Enchiladas suizas ====
The dish most associated with Sanborns is the enchiladas suizas ("Swiss enchiladas"), chicken enchiladas in green sauce, covered with cream and melted cheese. Their origin is not documented, and there are three main stories.

The Sanborns version, repeated in the press, is that Walter Sanborn thought the melted cheese looked like the snow of the Swiss Alps. In another, told in 2009 by the chef Rodrigo Llanes, his great-great-grandfather was a steward of Emperor Maximilian's household. The family opened a restaurant called Café Imperio in Mexico City, and the dish was invented there; when the café closed, its customers went on ordering the dish at the Jockey Club, and it ended up at Sanborns. No years are given, and the account rests on family memory. The third comes from Carla Zarebska, who is cited by Chrisman as saying they were created in the Café del Prado in 1949. The dish itself shows up on Sanborns menus in the 1950s.

The dish has since become generic: Vips, the competing chain, says it sells 1.7 million orders a year.

==== Other popular items ====
Other popular items identified with Sanborns are the molletes (sandwiches of refried beans and melted cheese), coffee with free refills, rosca de reyes cakes for Three Kings Day (Epiphany), and other cakes and doughnuts. El Financiero repeated the story that the mollete was invented in the Casa de los Azulejos by an aunt of television host Yordi Rosado, but presented it as only hearsay.

=== Stores and departments ===
Larger locations also function as a junior department store, with departments including:

- electronics including TVs, cameras, small appliances, cellphones and accessories, tablets, laptops and accessories
- entertainment: music, video, videogames, guitars, keyboards and musical instruments
- pharmacy service counter and personal care
- cosmetics and fragrances
- magazines and books
- toys and board games
- bakery service counter, candy, fine wines, liquor, tobacco products
- men's, women's and children's clothing and accessories including sunglasses
- gifts, home decoration, stationery, luggage and other travel goods
- financial services such as payment of utility and other bills, pre-payment of cellular service, and cash deposits to bank accounts

The chain also runs an online store selling merchandise from the same categories.

In the 1920s Sanborns also sold cigarettes, ice cream, perfume, imported brands such as Gillette and Colgate, and its own cough drops and creams. In the tearoom, a man known as Panchito sold cigarettes in the 1920s and 1930s. The agua de colonia, with an orange-blossom scent, has been sold since 1927, and is still on the shelves. The store also made its own chocolates, which it has done since the 1920s.

== Sanborns in Mexican culture ==
Historian Kevin Michael Chrisman argues that Sanborns was a place where Mexicans of different classes and genders acted out their identities, and where the changing gender roles, nationalism and openness to foreign capital of 20th-century Mexico could be seen in everyday life. He writes that it moved from an elite leisure space in the 1920s to a middle-class one under Walgreens, and later to a space shared across classes. Its best-known branch, in the Casa de los Azulejos, is a tourist sight, and the store appears often in Mexican novels, chronicles and film.

=== Social life in the 1920s and 1930s ===
Sanborns presented itself as the "rendezvous of society", and the Casa de los Azulejos gave its American commercial model the prestige of a colonial palace. A banquet hall for 350 people opened on August 11, 1921. The te dansant with a jazz orchestra was, in the words of El Universal in 1922, "la preferida por la alta sociedad" (the favorite of high society), and a brochure listed some 70 songs and dances, among them the foxtrot, the tango and the waltz. Not everyone approved: in 1922 the newspaper El Mundo al Día called Sanborns a "famous cabaret".

The store focused on women as customers. As early as 1914 it advertised "Every Day is Ladies Day at Sanborns" and offered a free telephone. In the 1920s it had a ready-to-wear department and a powder room, run by an American, Ann Scrivner, and a 1929 ad in Mexican Life called it "Mexico's New Fashion Center". There was a free manicurist, hairdresser, stenographer and typist, and a women's restroom with marble sinks and large mirrors. The tearoom did not serve alcohol and closed at 10 pm in 1924.

For the foreign community, Sanborns held luncheons for the Los Angeles Chamber of Commerce in 1923 and the American Chamber of Commerce of Mexico in 1924, and a Thanksgiving dinner at $5 per person in 1929. It also sold boxed lunches for trips to Teotihuacán, Xochimilco and Taxco.

=== Clientele ===
In 1950s and 1960s accounts, the store was where politicians, officials and writers had breakfast. Agustín Barrios Gómez wrote that there was "no important man in Mexico who had not had coffee in Sanborns". Regular groups had their own tables, nicknamed "The Scorpions" and "The Communists", and the lawyer Andrés Serra Rojas had a political table, "Las Peñas", from the early 1930s. Carlos Monsiváis recalled seeing President Adolfo López Mateos there, and a 1956 newspaper column by Luis Correa Sarabia has President Miguel Alemán Valdés asking his aides what was being said at Sanborns. The Lafragua branch, near the Chamber of Deputies, was a center of political breakfasts in the 1970s and 1980s (see Notable closed branches).

=== American import and Mexican identity ===
Scholars have described Sanborns as a mix of imported and Mexican influences or identities. Puga notes that fixed prices and store credit replaced bargaining and street markets, and that the store combined the European department store and the American soda fountain (lunch counter) with folkloric touches such as silver and the enchiladas suizas on a menu with a French look. Chrisman argues that American companies had to adapt to local tastes and knowledge, so that Sanborns cannot be seen only as an import.

In the 1930s the company moved toward a deliberately Mexican image. Fred Davis joined in 1933 and ran a department of Mexican crafts and curios, and the waitress uniform was redesigned from several regional indigenous styles. The writers Rodolfo Usigli (in 1944) and Carlos Fuentes mocked the costume, calling the waitresses "disguised" as indigenous women, and Chrisman links the uniform to ideas about indigenous identity and service. In the 1970s customers nicknamed the waitresses "esthercitas" ("little Esthers"), after the regional dresses of President Luis Echeverría's wife, María Esther Zuno. Today they are sometimes called "samborinas".

The Monterrey store, which opened on July 16, 1936, was decorated with serapes on the floor, handmade furniture and framed Mexican landscapes, and its cocktail lounge was described in terms of an "old Spanish custom". The number of foreign visitors to Mexico rose from 24,000 in 1930 to 126,000 in 1940, and in 1941 The New York Times recommended Sanborns alongside the pyramids and Chapultepec, saying one could buy "anything from milk of magnesia to antiques of the Spanish colonial period".

=== Employees ===
Sanborns employed mostly women. In the Monterrey store 98 of 110 employees were women in the mid-1940s. In October 1947, 37 of the 44 women who attended a meeting voted to join an independent restaurant workers' union, and a strike followed that ended in January 1948. A larger strike took place in the Mexico City store in December 1948. The company published an employee magazine, Azulejos, and sponsored a relay race between Chapultepec and Madero Street from 1928 to 1932, and baseball and softball teams.

=== Gay meeting place ===
From the 1950s on, Sanborns branches became meeting places for gay men, especially the Reforma branch (opened in 1953), the one at Niza in the Zona Rosa, and the Conjunto Aristos store at Insurgentes and Aguascalientes, which was called "la esquina mágica". The magazine racks, where customers could browse without buying, and the bathrooms were the main places of contact. An interviewee told Chrisman that Sanborns was "the cathedral of homosexuality in Mexico". The Tíber branch on Reforma was also a well-known gay meeting place in the 1980s (see Notable closed branches). Management added mirrors, urinal partitions and bathroom attendants, which interviewees believed were introduced after Carlos Slim bought the company in 1985. Police raids and extortion are documented from the 1970s to the 1990s.

=== In literature, film and popular memory ===
Sanborns appears in numerous Mexican books. Novo describes it in La estatua de sal (1945) and in Nueva grandeza mexicana (1946), as a place to eat or buy everyday goods, with a fresco by Orozco and the memory of the Jockey Club. Other examples listed by Puga are:

- Rodolfo Usigli, Ensayo de un crimen (1944), with the waitresses in "fake aboriginal outfits"
- Carlos Fuentes, The Death of Artemio Cruz (1962), where women shop for wedding goods
- Gustavo Sainz, Gazapo (1965), where teenagers meet in the Reforma branch
- Rafael Bernal, El complot mongol, where the hit man Filiberto García uses it
- Luis Zapata Quintero, El vampiro de la colonia Roma (1979), where male sex workers wait in several branches
- Ángeles Mastretta, Arráncame la vida, in which General Andrés Ascencio gives his wife the restaurant as a gift.

The Spanish writer Arturo Pérez-Reverte wrote an article about the 1914 breakfast photograph in 1996, titled "Desayuno en Sanborn's". In 1999, delegates of the Zapatista Army of National Liberation visited a Sanborns and re-created the scene of 1914.

The film adaptation of Arráncame la vida was added to Netflix in 2024, and the press reported renewed interest in the Casa de los Azulejos as a result.

Everyday habits are also part of its image. A 2016 list in Chilango includes using the clean, free bathroom, reading magazines and comics, looking at greeting cards (a much larger section in the 1980s), staring at the birthday cakes, using the pharmacy for last-minute purchases, buying a last-minute gift and watching football (soccer) matches at the bar.

=== Advertising ===
Little has been written about the advertising. Documented examples include the 1910 "Meet Me at the Fountain", the 1914 "Every Day is Ladies Day", English-language booklets for hotels from 1921, postcards of the façade and the mural, and a 1980s television commercial for the cologne that used the line "Tenemos que confesar que sí refresca" (We have to confess that it does refresh). The company's centenary in 2003 presented Sanborns as a Mexican "tradition", and President Vicente Fox visited that year.

== Locations ==
Sanborns at Plaza Río, Tijuana

As of November 2026, the Sanborns store finder lists 140 branches in 26 of Mexico's 32 federal entities, 57 of them in Mexico City and 20 in the State of Mexico. There are no branches in Baja California Sur, Colima, Durango, Nayarit, Oaxaca or Tlaxcala.

Sanborns branches by state, November 2026
State	Branches	Cities (branches)
Mexico City	57	see below
State of Mexico	20	Naucalpan (5), Cuautitlán Izcalli (4), Ecatepec (2), Atizapán de Zaragoza, Coacalco, Huixquilucan, La Paz, Metepec, Nezahualcóyotl, Texcoco, Tlalnepantla, Toluca
Veracruz	6	Veracruz (2), Boca del Río, Coatzacoalcos, Orizaba, Xalapa
Morelos	5	Cuernavaca (5)
Chihuahua	4	Chihuahua (2), Ciudad Juárez (2)
Jalisco	4	Zapopan (3), Guadalajara
Nuevo León	4	Monterrey (3), San Pedro Garza García
Puebla	4	Puebla (4)
Querétaro	4	Querétaro (4)
Baja California	3	Tijuana (2), Mexicali
Guerrero	2	Acapulco (2)
Michoacán	3	Morelia (3)
San Luis Potosí	3	San Luis Potosí (3)
Aguascalientes	2	Aguascalientes (2)
Coahuila	2	Saltillo, Torreón
Guanajuato	2	Celaya, León
Hidalgo	2	Mineral de la Reforma, Pachuca
Quintana Roo	2	Cancún (2)
Tabasco	2	Villahermosa (2)
Tamaulipas	2	Reynosa, Tampico
Yucatán	2	Mérida (2)
Campeche	1	Ciudad del Carmen
Chiapas	1	Tuxtla Gutiérrez
Sinaloa	1	Culiacán (Note: Listed as temporarily closed in October 2026.)
Sonora	1	Hermosillo
Zacatecas	1	Zacatecas
Total	140 (Note: Includes the temporarily closed Culiacán store and the Sanborns Home & Fashion store at Plaza Carso, which the store finder lists separately from the main Plaza Carso branch. Excludes the Casa Boker entry, which the store finder still lists although the branch closed in 2024.)	

Sanborns branches in Mexico City by borough, October 2026
Borough (alcaldía)	Branches	Colonias (branches)
Benito Juárez	11	Del Valle (4), Moderna, Narvarte, Piedad Narvarte, San José Insurgentes, San Pedro de los Pinos, Santa Cruz Atoyac, Sinatel Miravalle
Cuauhtémoc	11	Centro (4), Roma Norte (2), Buenavista, Ex-Hipódromo de Peralvillo, Hipódromo Condesa, Juárez, Santa María la Ribera
Miguel Hidalgo	6	Ampliación Granada (2), Polanco (2), Lomas de Chapultepec, San Miguel Chapultepec
Álvaro Obregón	6	Jardines del Pedregal, Lomas de Santa Fe, Merced Gómez, Puente Colorado, San Ángel, Tizapán
Coyoacán	4	Del Carmen, Jardines del Pedregal, Parque San Andrés, Pedregal de Carrasco
Tlalpan	4	Residencial Miramontes, Tlalpan Centro, Toriello Guerra, Villa Coapa
Azcapotzalco	3	Centro de Azcapotzalco, San Salvador Xochimanca, Santa Cruz de las Salinas
Gustavo A. Madero	3	La Escalera, Lindavista, Magdalena de las Salinas
Iztapalapa	3	Alfonso Ortiz Tirado, Central de Abasto, La Esperanza
Iztacalco	2	Agrícola Pantitlán, INFONAVIT Iztacalco
Venustiano Carranza	2	Jardín Balbuena, Moctezuma
Cuajimalpa	1	Lomas de Vista Hermosa
Xochimilco	1	San Marcos

Sanborns branches in Mexico City (red, 1–57) and in neighboring municipalities of the State of Mexico (blue, 58–77), and notable closed branches (black, A–D), November 2026. Hover over or tap a marker for the branch name, place and state.

=== Notable open branches ===
The Sanborns Riviera on Avenida División del Norte in Colonia del Valle, Mexico City is popularly known as the Sanborns de los Pajaritos ("Sanborns of the little birds"), after the parakeets, canaries and other small birds that fly loose in its garden dining area. The nickname spread widely after videos of the restaurant circulated on TikTok.

=== Notable closed branches ===
The letters A to D refer to the black markers on the map above.

The Casa Boker building, home of a Sanborns branch from 1976 to 2024

- Tíber a.k.a. Sanborns del Ángel (Mexico City; marker A): The branch at Paseo de la Reforma 333 at the corner of Río Tíber, listed by the company as "Tíber" but popularly called the "Sanborns del Ángel", faced the Angel of Independence from the ground floor of the Edificio Bolivia, an office building by José Villagrán García that formed part of Antenor Patiño's Hotel María Isabel complex and housed the Mexican headquarters of Ford. The site had previously been occupied by the townhouse of George T. Braniff, built between 1912 and 1919 and demolished around 1960; Sanborns moved into the corner space in 1968. For half a century the store looked on as crowds gathered at the monument for football celebrations and political rallies, and in the 1980s it was a well-known meeting place for the city's gay community. It had closed by mid-2018, when the chain was operating eleven fewer stores than a year earlier. In February 2025 Carlos Slim said the branch had been given up because it had no parking and the landlord wanted to double the rent. The space is now occupied by a Citibanamex branch and a Shake Shack.
- Casa Boker (Mexico City; marker B), opened in 1976 in the historic Casa Boker building on Isabel la Católica street; closed in 2024.
- Lafragua (Mexico City; marker C), opened in 1954 near the offices of the Chamber of Deputies and the headquarters of the Confederation of Mexican Workers, and a center of political breakfasts in the 1970s and 1980s; closed in 2018.
- San Ángel (Mexico City; marker D), near Parque de la Bombilla and one of the oldest branches in the city; closed in 2020.
- Panama City (2007–2020) and two stores in San Salvador (closed 2020), outside the area of the map.

== Gallery ==
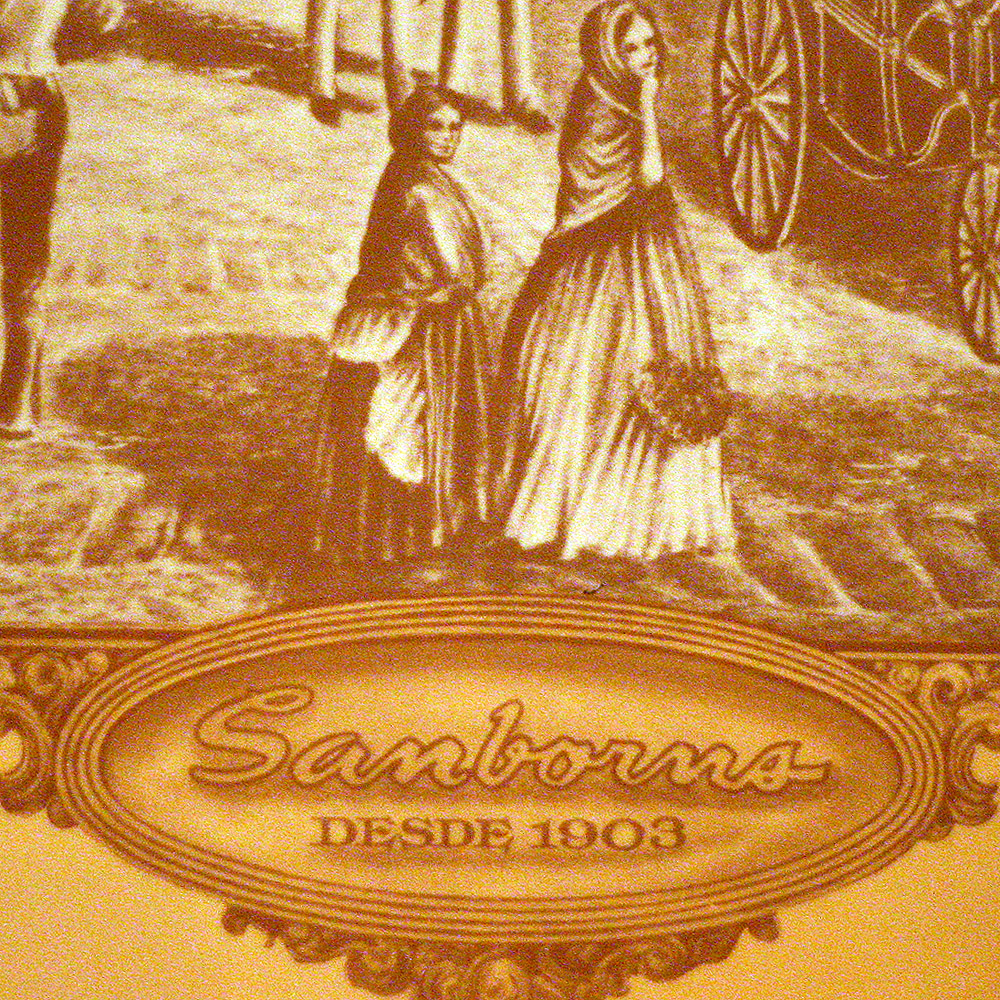
The Sanborns sign with its three owls at the Casa de los Azulejos

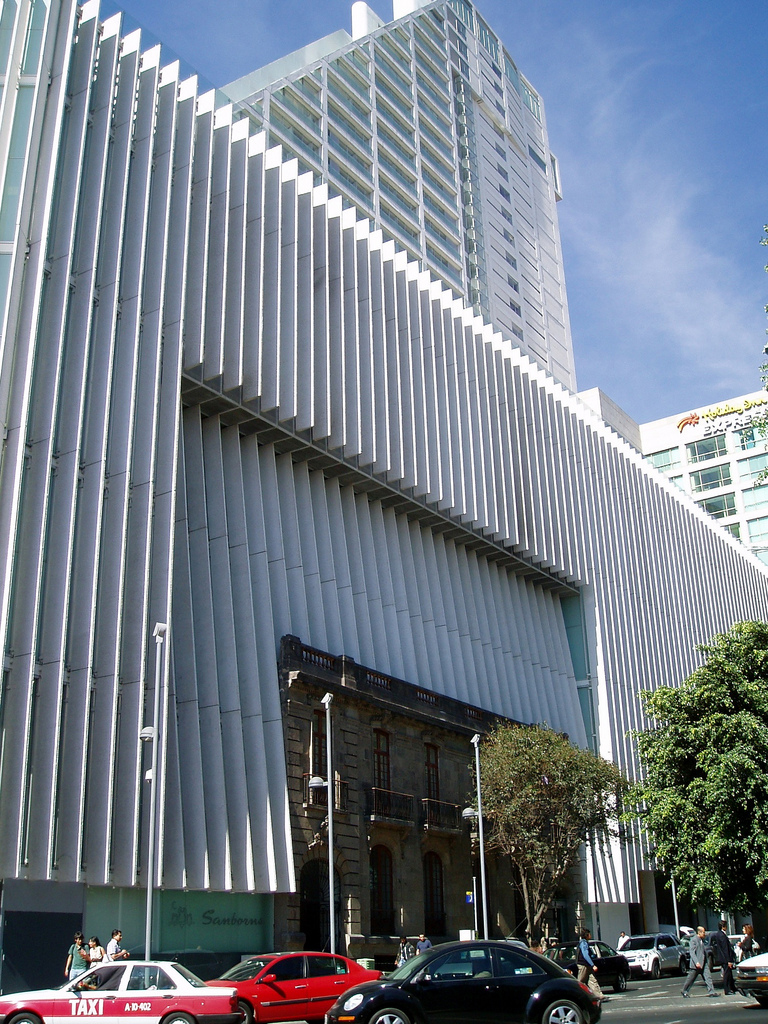
A modern Sanborns in Mexico City using the facade of a 19th-century house as its entrance

Sanborns at Isabel la Católica and República de Uruguay, historic center, 2008

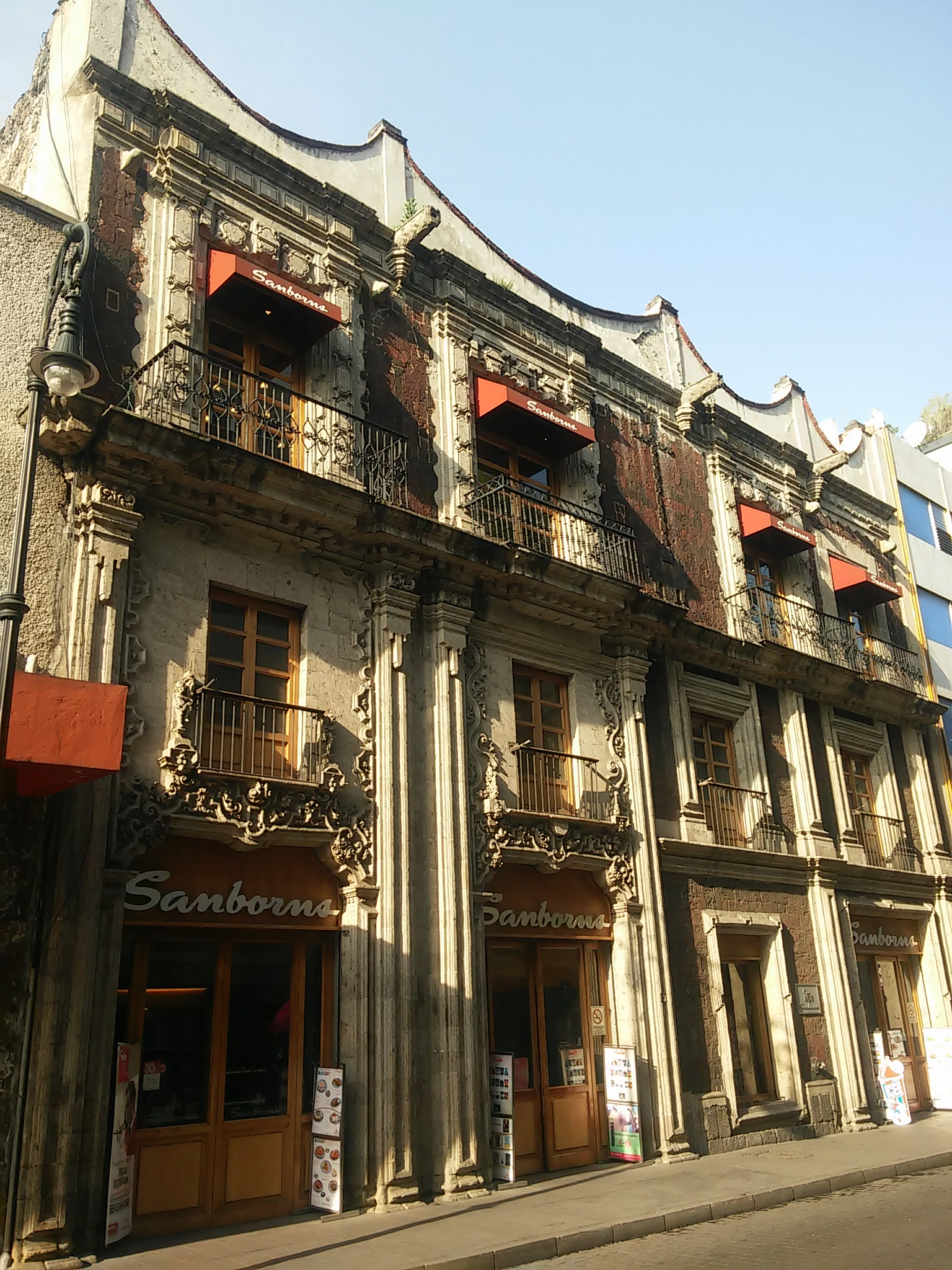
The house of the Counts of San Bartolomé de Xala, home of the Condes de Xala branch

Sanborns on Insurgentes, 2011

Sanborns in downtown Aguascalientes

Former branch on Paseo de Montejo, Mérida, 2009

Enchiladas suizas at the Casa de los Azulejos

Perfume counters, Sanborns Masaryk in Polanco, 2023

Watch and jewelry counters, Sanborns Masaryk, Polanco 2023

Book and magazine department, Sanborns Masaryk, Polanco 2023

Pharmacy, Sanborns Masaryk, Polanco 2023

Personal care appliances and dermocosmetics, Sanborns Masaryk, Polanco 2023
