= Convent of San Francisco, Madero Street, Mexico City =

Coordinates: 19°26′0.42″N 99°8′24.71″W

Convent of San Francisco
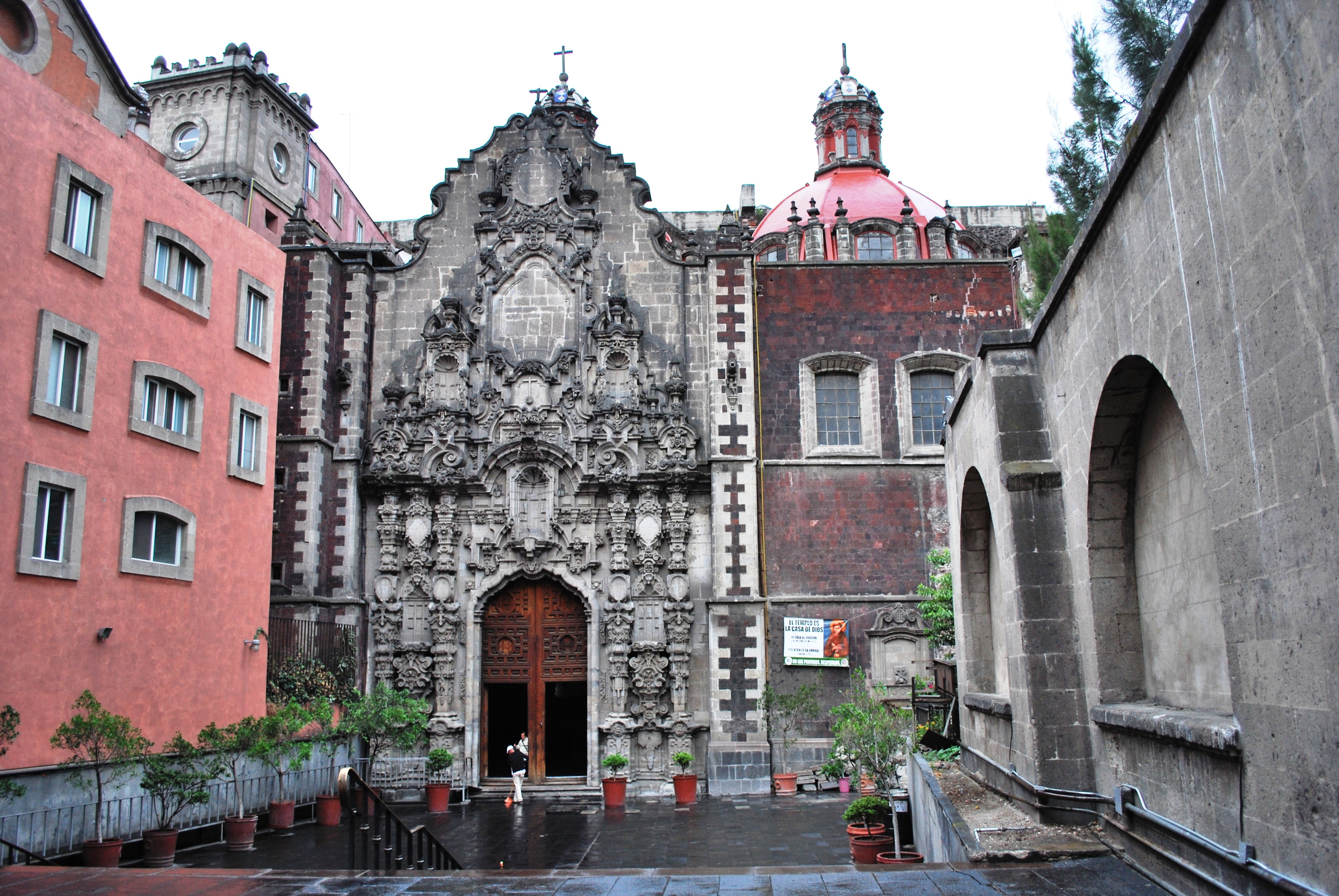
- View of the Balvanera Chapel entrance from Madero Street
- Interactive map of the Convent of San Francisco area

General information
- Location: Mexico City, Mexico

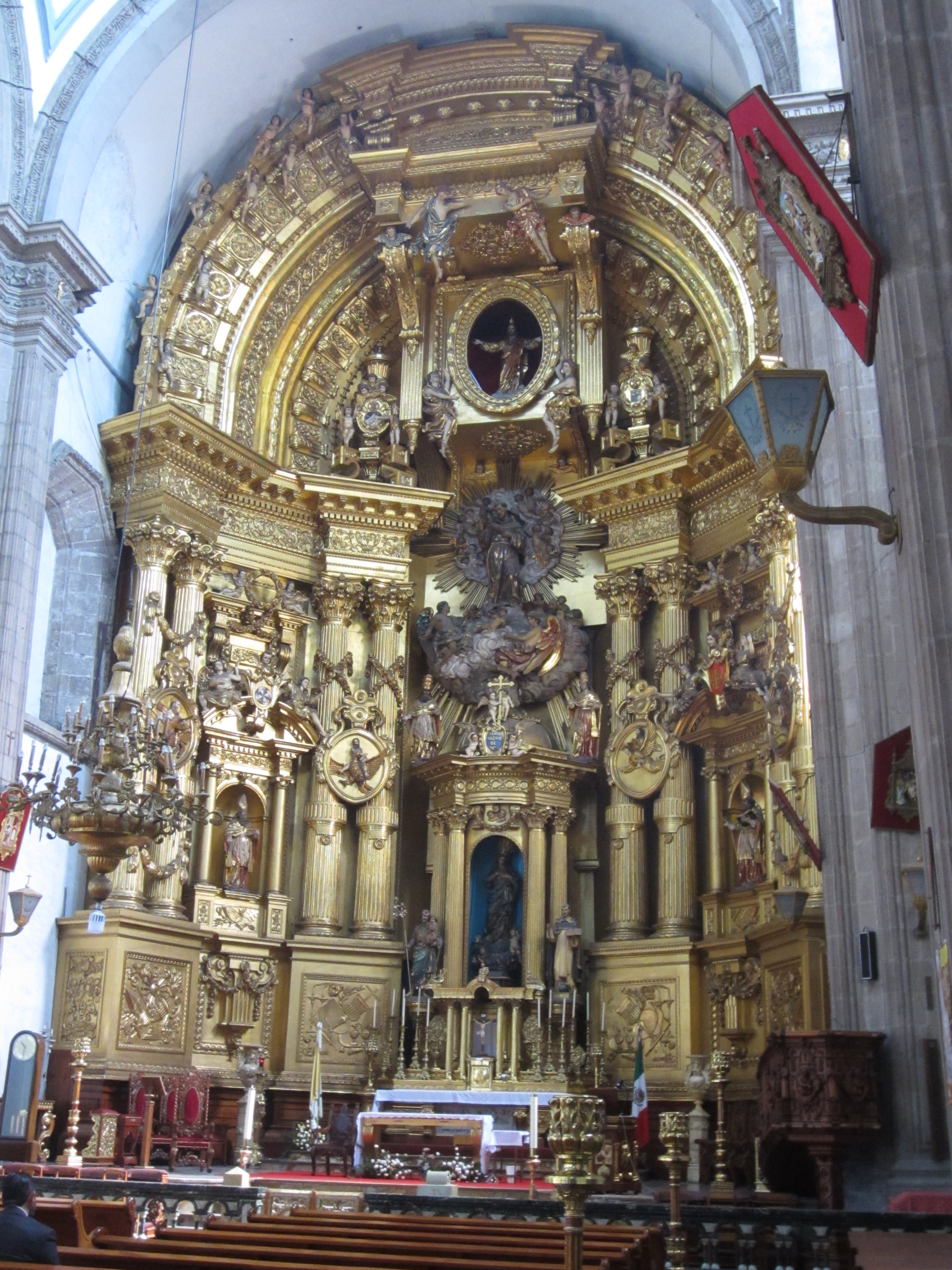
Main altar

The Convent of San Francisco (historically known in Spanish as the 'Convento Grande de San Francisco') is located at the western end of Madero Street in the historic center of Mexico City, near the Torre Latinoamericana and is all that remains of the church and monastery complex. This complex was the headquarters of the first twelve Franciscan friars headed by Martín de Valencia who came to Mexico after receiving the first authorization from the Pope to evangelize in New Spain. In the early colonial period, this was one of the largest and most influential monasteries in Mexico City. It was built on the site of where Moctezuma II’s zoo once was. At its peak, the church and monastery covered the blocks now bordered by Bolivar, Madero, Eje Central and Venustiano Carranza Streets, for a total area of 32,224 square metres (3.2 ha; 8.0 acres).

In the patio of the first cloister, there was a cross that was reputedly taller than the highest tower in the city and made from a cypress tree from the “Chapultepec Forest”, meaning the forested area to the west of the Zocalo, where San Francisco was built.

The church and monastery saw a number of historic events in its time. A funeral mass for Hernán Cortés was here when it was thought that he died in Central America. In 1629, the Marquis of Gelves arrived in disguise to hide after quarreling with the archbishop. In 1692, the Count of Galve and his wife were granted refuge there due to a large-scale rebellion in the city. The end of the Mexican War of Independence was celebrated with a Te Deum at the monastery as the Trigarante Army of 16,000 troops marched past on Madero Street headed by Agustín de Iturbide. After the Reform War, the monastery of San Francisco, like many others, was disbanded and most of the property seized by the government. Much of the old monastery was demolished for the construction of new roads. Other parts of the old building are now a Methodist church facing Gante Street and a Panadería Ideal bakery. Where the bakery is now on 16 de Septiembre Street used to be the De Profundus Room, and the church is housed in the old cloister. On the corner of Venustiano Carranza and Eje Central are what used to be the Calvario and San Antonio chapels. These buildings still exist only because it was more expensive to demolish them than to leave them standing. All that is still left in church hands is the church itself.

The church standing today is the third to be built on the site. The first two sunk into the soft soil underneath Mexico City and had to be torn down. This church was built between 1710 and 1716. Although the entire building is known as the San Francisco Church, the entrance on Madero Street is actually the entrance to the Balvanera Chapel. In front of this is an atrium with several sets of stairs leading down to the church building because it, too, is sinking. The church's main facade, dating from 1710, is walled in and cannot be seen. Entrance is now through the side door into the Balvanera Chapel, then into the main church. The facade of the chapel was constructed in 1766 and it is not sure who constructed it but most think it was the work of Lorenzo Rodríguez, best known for his work on the Metropolitan Tabernacle. The chapel's statues were removed when the chapel was in the hands of an Evangelical sect, but it kept other decorative elements such as volutes, sculpted leaves and flowers and the estipite (inverted truncated pyramid) columns with medallions. Inside there is an 18th-century altarpiece dedicated to the Virgin of Guadalupe as well as the entrance to what was once the Chapel of the Second Station of the Stations of the Cross.

In the main church, there is a large gilded main altar, which is one that replaced the original Baroque one. This original one has been reconstructed because Neoclassic artist Jerónimo Antonio Gil left a drawing of it. Only the walls of the original De Profundis Room remain, the rest is remodeled into a bakery. The old cloister on Gante Street has fared a bit better. It is now a Methodist church, where inside both floors of the cloister have been well preserved. It can be visited only with prior authorization.

== Notable associated Franciscans ==
- Martín de Valencia, founder of the Convent
- Juan Agustín Morfi, Guardián of the Convent and most important chronicler of the New Philippines (Note: "se trata del principal historiador y cronista de la provincia de Nuevas Filipinas")

== See also ==
- List of colonial churches in Mexico City
- 18th-century Western domes
