= Borda House, Mexico City =

House in Mexico City, Mexico

Coordinates: 19°26′0.86″N 99°8′15.57″W

Borda House
- Casa Borda
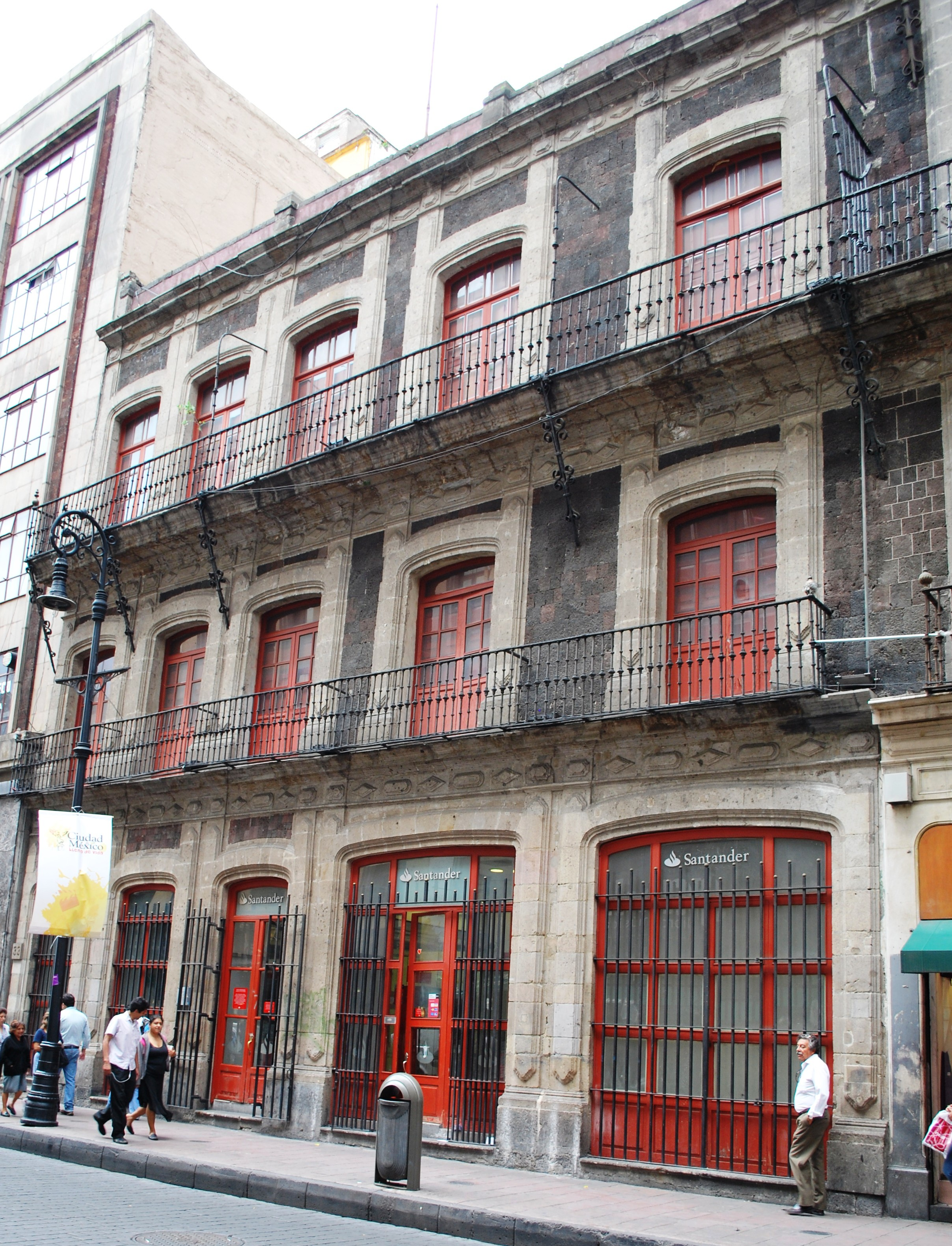
- Facade of the Borda House

General information
- Architectural style: New Spanish Baroque
- Construction started: 1775
- Client: José de la Borda

Design and construction
- Architect: Francisco Antonio Guerrero y Torres

The Borda House, located on 27, 29 and 33 Madero Street, and 26-28 Bolivar streets in the historic center of Mexico City, originally belonged to the Frenchman José de la Borda (Joseph de Laborde) who was one of the richest men in New Spain in the 18th century. It stands out due to its notable architectural features such as the sculpted stone decorative details on the ground floor. The original building encompassed the entire city block. It had various inner courtyards, and Borda had an ironwork balcony built all the way around the building, supported by angles in the shape of rooster feet. This allowed one to walk all the way around the building on the outside.

== The original building ==
This mansion was built as a gift for Borda's wife of 16 years, Teresa Verdugo y Aragonés and it was intended to rival that of Hernán Cortés and his descendants. It is located near the old monastery of San Francisco and the Palace of Iturbide. It was built by the most famous architect of the time, Francisco Antonio Guerrero y Torres covered an entire city block, bounded by 2nd San Francisco, Coliseo, Colegio de Niñas and Espiritu Santo Streets. Today these streets are known as Madero, Bolivar, 16 de Septiembre and Motolinia. It had three floors, covered in red tezontle rock and grey white sandstone. Near the main entrance was a large niche with a statue of the Virgin of Guadalupe. The original building had two floors with ironwork railing that wound around the entire building on the second and third floors.

The interior had a monumental library, four dining rooms, 25 alcoves, three kitchens, two stables, three offices and two chapels. The entire interior was richly decorated with carpets, heavy curtains, paintings, porcelain, clocks, sculptures, and richly carved furniture.

== The current building ==
Over the centuries, the mansion was fragmented and most of it demolished, leaving today five plots, four of which contain the original façade and double balcony. The building on 28 Bolivar street which houses the Hotel Coliseo has an early 20th-century façade, but the lower inner part is original of the Casa Borda. At the beginning of the 20th century, number 33 on Madero street was home to the Salón Rojo, one of the first movie houses in the city. The Salón Rojo was created by Salvador Toscano and then reinaugurated by German Camus and featured an electric escalator. In the 1950s, it housed an upscale carpet business and then it was a post office. In the later 20th century, it was bought by the Santander Serfin bank and part of it used as the Serfin Museum. The museum offered a small collection of indigenous clothing and colonial-era garb. It has a kind of embroidery and featherwork "dictionary" designed to explain the significance of the different designs found in the exhibits. It is now closed. Number 26 on the Bolivar side is the only remaining plot which has all the original interiors from the 18th century, all the other plots were demolished, with just the façades remaining. It housed the Harem Baths in the first part of the 20th century, remaining as a witness a tile panel representing Neptune on the stables court. At the beginning of the new millennium, it was completely renovated and rescued by the Yturbe family.
