= Convent Church of Santo Domingo, Puebla =

Church in Puebla, Mexico

Templo conventual de Santo Domingo de Guzmán
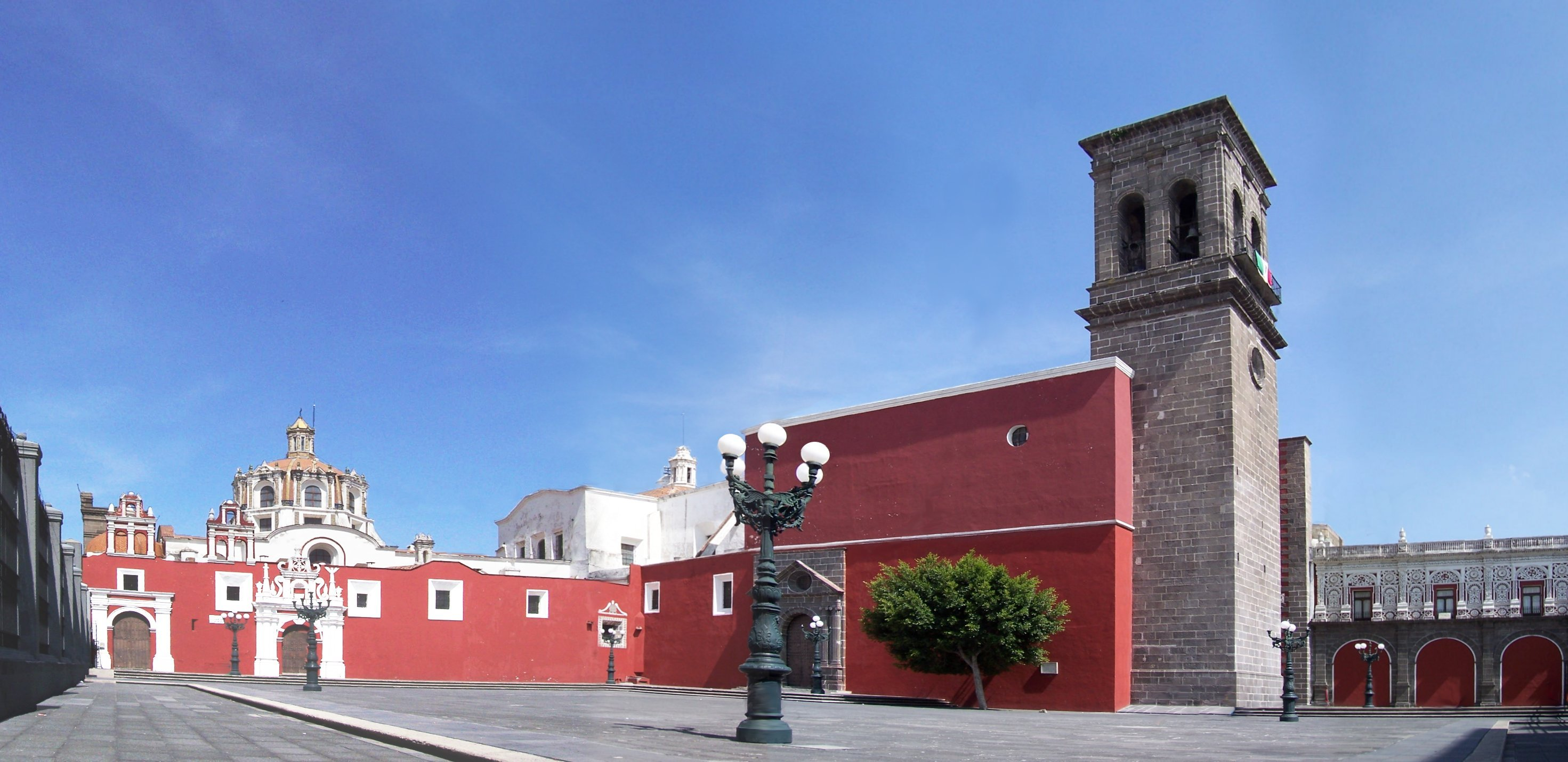

- Location within Mexico

Location
- Interactive map of Templo conventual de Santo Domingo de Guzmán
- Coordinates: 19°02′49″N 98°11′53″W

Architecture
- Style: Baroque
- Completed: 1611

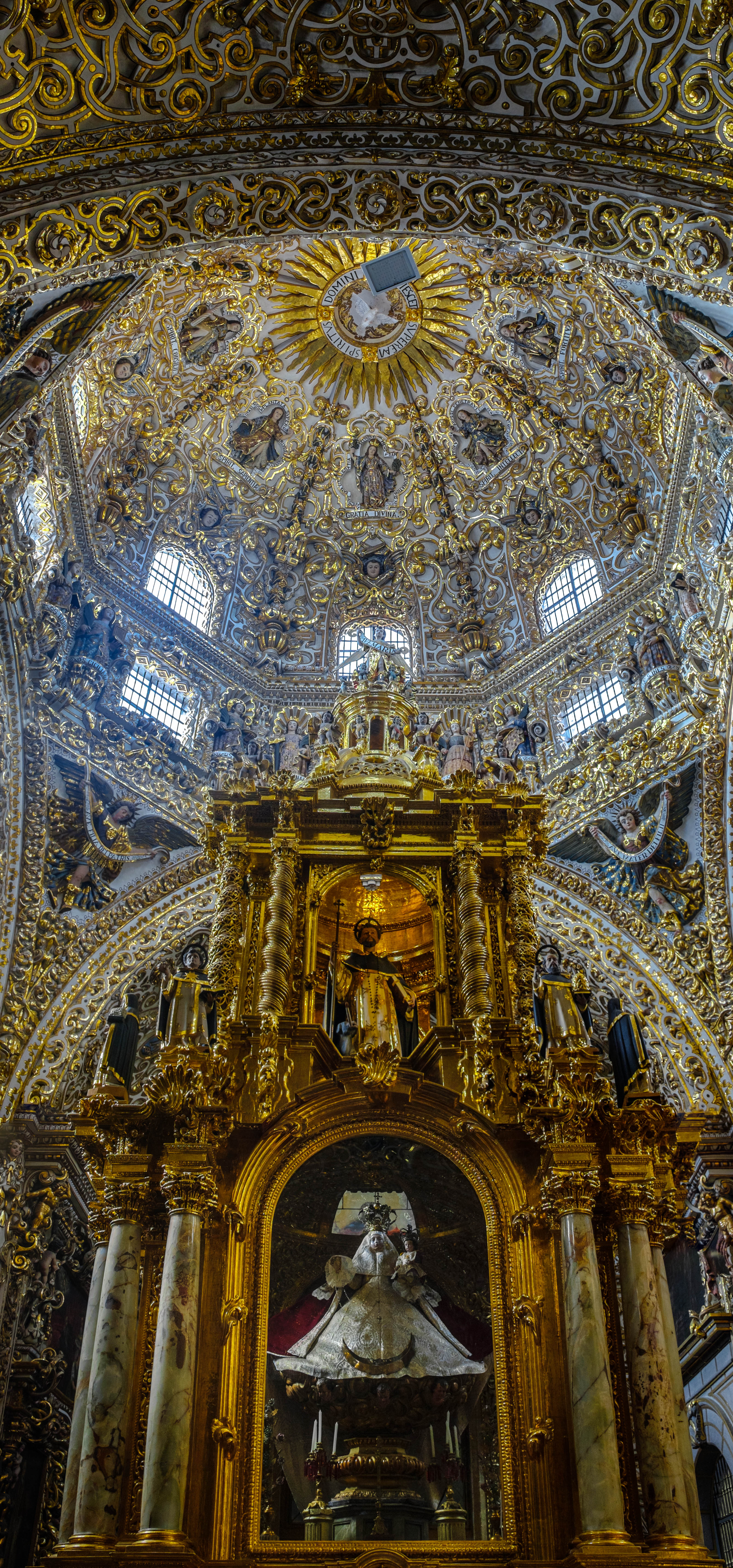
Chapel of the Rosario

The Convent Church of Santo Domingo de Guzmán is a Roman Catholic church within the jurisdiction of the Roman Catholic Archdiocese of Puebla de los Angeles, with the archangel Michael as its patron saint. Attached to it is the Chapel of the Rosario, an example of New Spanish Baroque, considered in its time to be the "eighth wonder of the world". The church is located in Puebla's historic centre.

== See also ==
- Chapel of the Rosario, Puebla
- List of buildings in Puebla City
