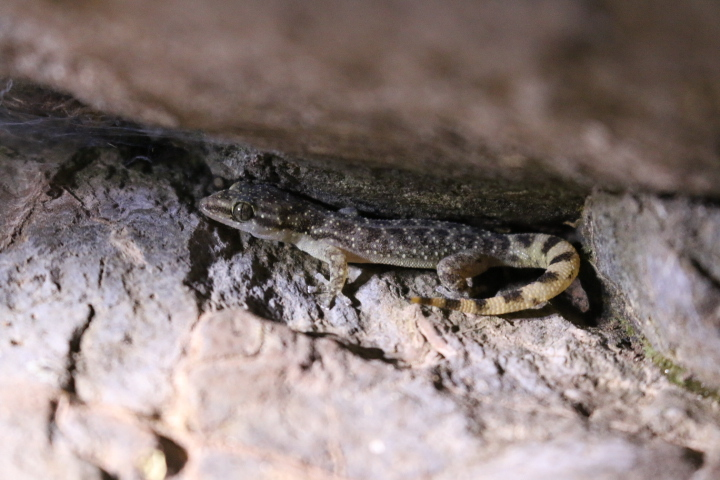

Conservation status
- Least Concern (IUCN 3.1)

Scientific classification
- Kingdom: Animalia
- Phylum: Chordata
- Class: Reptilia
- Order: Squamata
- Suborder: Gekkota
- Family: Phyllodactylidae
- Genus: Phyllodactylus
- Species: P. bordai

Binomial name
- Phyllodactylus bordai Taylor, 1942

= Guerreran leaf-toed gecko =

Species of lizard

The Guerreran leaf-toed gecko (Phyllodactylus bordai), also known commonly as the desert leaf-toed gecko and the salamanquesa de Guerrero in Spanish, is a species of lizard in the family Phyllodactylidae. The species is endemic to Mexico.

== Etymology ==
The specific name, bordai, is in honor of Spaniard José de la Borda, who discovered silver in Taxco in 1716, became extremely wealthy, and built the Church of Santa Prisca de Taxco.

== Geographic range ==
P. bordai is native to southern central Mexico, where it is found in the Mexican states of Guerrero, Morelos, Oaxaca, and Puebla.

== Habitat ==
The preferred natural habitat of P. bordai is forest.

== Reproduction ==
P. bordai is oviparous.
