= Capilla del Rosario =

Capilla del Rosario may refer to the following:

- Capilla del Rosario, a town in Mendoza Province in Argentina
- Capilla del Rosario, Puebla City, Mexico, once known as the "Eighth Wonder of the World".
