= José de la Borda =

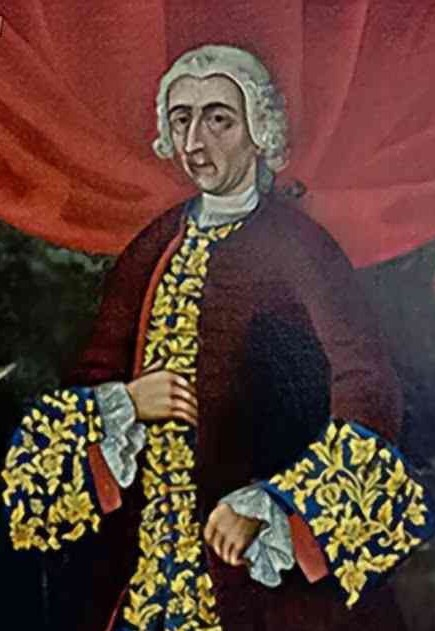
Don José de la Borda, portrait is located in the Santa Prisca Church of Taxco, Guerrero.

José de la Borda (Joseph de Laborde in French; c. 1700 – May 30, 1778) was a Spaniard who migrated to New Spain in the 18th century, amassing a great fortune in mines in Taxco and Zacatecas in Mexico. At one point, he was the richest man in Mexico. He is best remembered today through several architectural works that he sponsored, the most monumental being the Santa Prisca Church in Taxco.

== Early life and arrival to Mexico ==
José de la Borda was born either in the province of Jaca in the then kingdom of Aragon (Spain) or in the French province of Béarn in either 1699 or 1700. Borda was the second son of Pierre Laborde, an officer in the army of Louis XIV of France and a Spaniard named Magdalena Sanchez. José claimed 2 January 1699, in Jaca as his date and place of birth, although there are no documents to back that up. The portraits in the museums of Taxco and Chapultepec both affirm he was born in France. Jean Joseph (de) Laborde, a French financer born in Jaca in 1724, confirmed José's French-Spanish nationality.

José's older brother, Francisco, left Europe for Mexico in 1708. Eight years later, he wrote for José to join him to work with him at the La Lajuela mine he founded in Tehuilotepec, near Taxco. At the time, the Taxco area had the richest mining in Mexico, producing iron, silver, gold and more. José arrived to Mexico in 1716, when he was only 17. Francisco died on January 5, 1744, and José inherited La Lajuela.

In 1720, José married Teresa Verdugo, the daughter of Captain Verdugo and the younger sister of Francisco's wife. The union produced two children, Ana María and Manuel (1727-1791). Teresa died in 1727, shortly after the birth of Manuel.

== Mining career ==
After working with his brother for a number of years, José set off to find new mineral strikes, arriving to Tlalpujahua in 1734. Here he founded a mine that was very successful. In 1738, his brother Francisco died and Borda inherited his brother's property. Deeper exploration of the original La Lajuela mine yielded an abundance of silver. It is from this strike that Borda first funded the building of the Santa Prisca Church. When this mine had nearly run out, he discovered a richer one in the Taxco called San Ignacio. With this money, he rebuilt and expanded the Santa Prisca Church. However, the San Ignacio mine produced for only nine years.

By 1760, Borda's mines had run out, forcing him to explore in Real de Monte and then in Chontalpan in 1761. By this time, he was practically bankrupt. Borda mortgaged the last major possession he owned in Taxco, the richly ornate Santa Prisca Church, in order to finance an expedition to Zacatecas. Once there, he initially worked in a mine called “La Quebradilla” but it did not produce as much as hoped and payments were coming due on the mortgage. With the last of his money, he opened the mine “La Esperanza” which again made him a wealthy man. With this new mine, Borda became the richest man in Zacatecas, as he had been before in Taxco. He was named a regent of Zacatecas.

By 1776, the aging Borda was affected by mercury poisoning and other illnesses. He wanted to return to Taxco, but his son Manuel convinced him to retire to the family house in Cuernavaca, where he thought the climate would be better. Here, Manuel was already living and practicing as a priest. Just before Borda died in 1778, his son administered last rites. In total, Borda's earnings from his mines in Mexico totaled 40 million pesos, and at the heights of his career was the richest man in Mexico and perhaps the world.

== Architectural works ==
Borda is remembered mostly through three architectural works which remain to this day: the Santa Prisca Church in Taxco, the Borda House, Mexico City on Madero Street, Borda House, Taxco and the Borda Garden in Cuernavaca. The most lavish and monumental of these is the Santa Prisca Church. Built between 1751 and 1758, Borda hired the best artists, such as Miguel Cabrera, as well as the best artisans for the project. As he completely financed the building (at a cost of $471,572 pesos) and operation of the church, he had total control over it aesthetically. It is described as exuberant Baroque or Churrigueresque with two large towers of pink stone. The church's organ is made with fine wood, and is still played 250 years after it was brought from Germany. The church is named after Saint Prisca, a female Roman aristocrat who defied Claudius II by repudiating Apollo in favor of Christ. At the time, it was one of the most richly adorned churches in New Spain. Many of its sculptures and other decorative features were covered in gold and jewels. Eventually, many of these items would make their way to the Mexico City Cathedral and Notre Dame in Paris.

The Borda Garden was originally a large mansion owned by the Borda family in Cuernavaca. He probably purchased the land for the house, which is across the street from what was then a Franciscan monastery (and today the Cuernavaca cathedral), in 1763. This is where Borda died in 1778. Later, Borda's son, Manuel, transformed the grounds of the house into gardens filled with flowers and fruit trees to satisfy his passion for botany. These gardens also contain a number of fountains and an artificial lake and were completed in 1783. In 1865, this was the summer home of Emperor Maximilian I and his wife Carlota Amalia. It hosted major political soirees in the 19th and 20th centuries such as those sponsored by Porfirio Díaz and Emiliano Zapata. Today the area is a public park where the gardens have been maintained, and the house itself has been converted into a museum.

The last is the Borda House located in Mexico City on Madero Street in the historic center. Originally the building encompassed an entire city block and was supposed to rival the palaces of Hernán Cortés and his descendants. It was also a present from Borda to his wife after he regained his wealth from his mines in Zacatecas. The building has two ironwork balconies on the two upper floors that went around the entire structure, allowing Borda to walk around the block without ever leaving his house. Since Borda's death, this building has been partitioned and most of it is lost except for a small section on Madero Street. The remains of the double balcony are still present.

== Legacy ==
God gives to La Borda and La Borda gives to God, reads his family's motto, explaining his generosity to the Roman Catholic Church. The Santa Prisca Church is the largest work associated with Borda, although he funded numerous social charities as well. Archbishop of New Spain, Antonio Jimenez y Frias said that he was “a miner distinguished for his charity, rare in his virtue, exceptional for his humility, a phoenix for his liberal views and, in a word, a hero of the rich miners of this America." ("Minero distinguido por su caridad, excepcional por su virtud, singular por su hamanitarismo, fénix por su incomparable liberaldad: en una palabra, el héroe de los ricos mineros de esta América".) There is a parchment signed by Pope Benedict XIV dedicated to the miner referring to him as a friend. However, he is also remembered as one who made his fortune by cruelly exploiting native labor.

A species of Mexican gecko, Phyllodactylus bordai, is named in his honor.

== See also ==
- List of people from Morelos
