= Church of Santa Prisca de Taxco =

Coordinates: 18°33′23″N 99°36′17″W

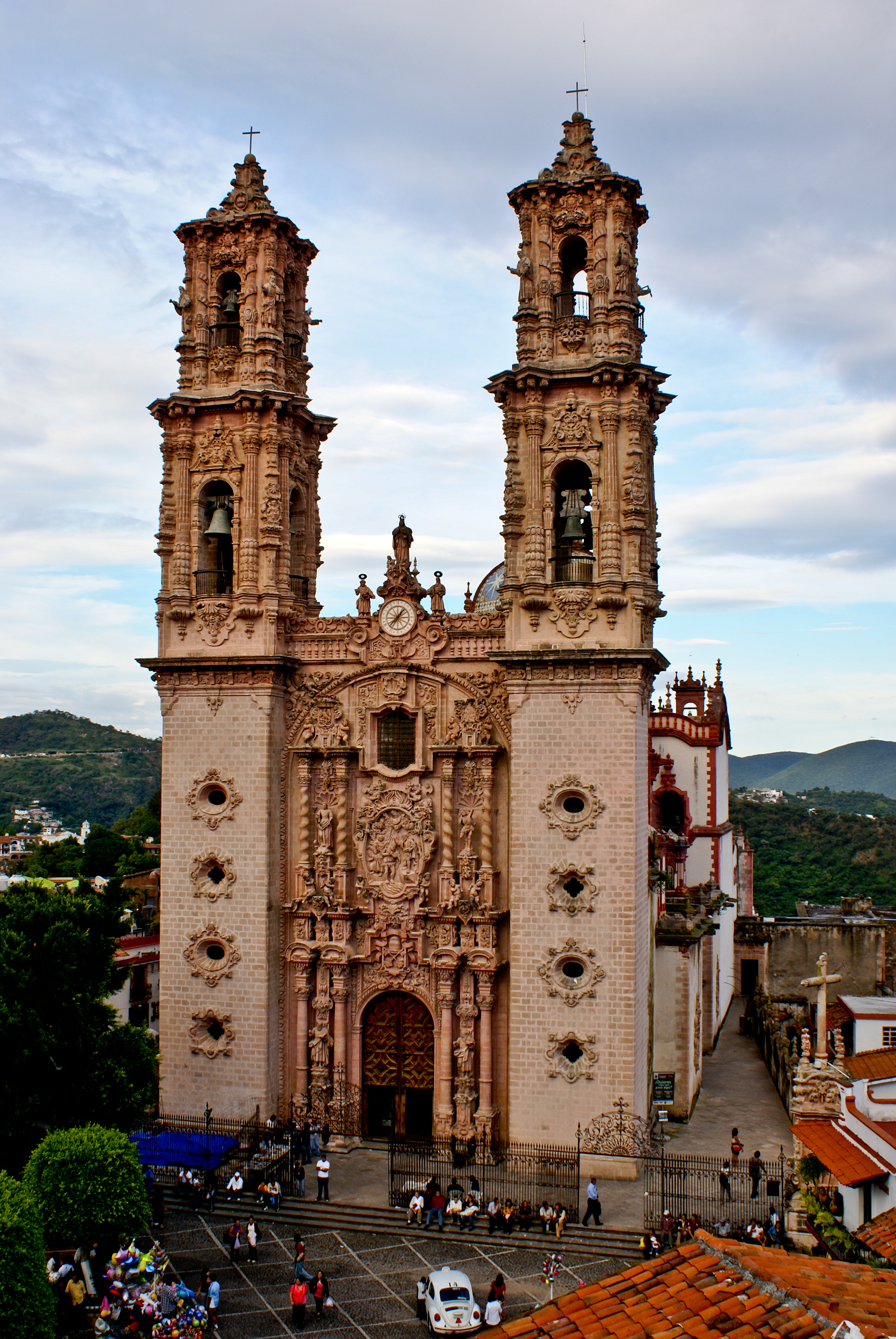
- The façade
- Church of Santa Prisca de Taxco
- Location: Taxco
- Country: Mexico
- Denomination: Roman Catholic Church

Architecture
- Style: New Spanish Baroque
- Groundbreaking: 1751
- Completed: 1759

Specifications
- Height: 40.40m (132.54 ft)
- Materials: Stone

The Parroquia de Santa Prisca y San Sebastián, commonly known as the Church of Santa Prisca, is a colonial monument located in the city of Taxco de Alarcón, in the southern state of Guerrero, Mexico, built between 1751 and 1759. It is located on the east side of the main plaza of Taxco.

The construction was ordered by José de la Borda, one of the most prosperous mine owners of the region of Taxco in the 18th century. From 1758 to 1806, the temple was the tallest building in Mexico, but was surpassed by the Church of Our Lady of Mount Carmel in San Luis Potosí City. The Church of Santa Prisca is considered one of the finest examples of the New Spanish Churrigueresque.

== Construction ==
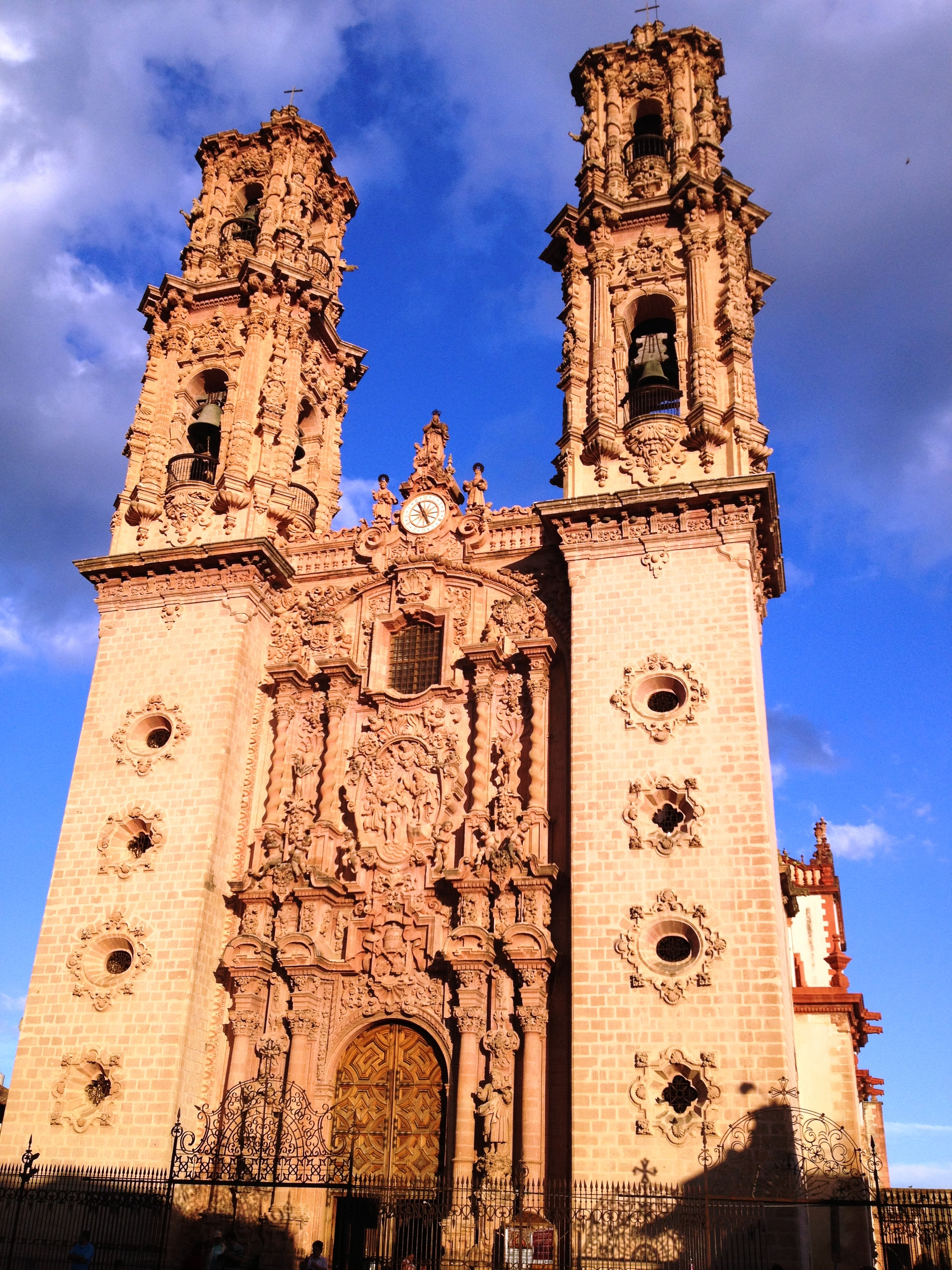
The Santa Prisca de Taxco, main representation of the New Spanish baroque in Taxco.

The church was built between 1751 and 1759 by José de la Borda (ca. 1700–1778), who had made a great fortune in the silver mines surrounding the town. Despite his wealth, however, the opulence of the church nearly bankrupted him. The construction of the church of Santa Prisca in Taxco lasted 15 years and was aimed at creating a space where the priest Manuel de la Borda—son of José de la Borda, benefactor and founder of the parish—could officiate mass.

Although he had arrived in Taxco only about thirty-five years before the construction of the Santa Prisca temple, José de la Borda was already one of the most important figures in the mining district, which is why the Archbishopric of Mexico allowed him to build the parish church entirely to his own taste.

Cayetano José de Siguenza drew the plans in the form of a very narrow Latin cross due to the conditions of the land and the architect Diego Durán Berruecos built it between 1751 and 1759. The altarpieces were designed by the brothers Isidoro Vicente and Luis de Balbás (adoptive sons of Jerónimo, the Mexican Churrigueresque master) who took advantage of the structure of the building to trace the symbolic and religious axes.

== Description ==
The parish is located in a small hollow with respect to the rest of the city of Taxco artificially leveled. It has a Latin cross plan, with a side nave that serves as a chapel for the altar of the Souls and a tribune on a street with Gothic ribbed vaults with tiercerons with a decorated main key that camouflages access to the Sagrario (sanctuary). It has two twin towers in the Churrigueresque style and a chapel decorated with Talavera azulejos, characteristic of New Spanish architecture.

The main facade is oriented to the west as was the custom, and in it classicist pilasters are combined with Solomonic columns used in the 17th century, which combined with posters, scrolls, ribbons, foliage, niches with saints, shields, diamond points, etc. arrive at an abundance of elements.

In this way, it is seen how the work has a great sense of verticality and dominance. The high Churrigueresque-style towers were crafted in their upper part to leave intact the plinth that acts as a visual buttress to frame the portal of the altarpiece. This front has a language of architectural composition, typical of the time, with cylindrical columns in the lower part and twisted columns in the upper part.

Santa Prisca has nine floor-to-ceiling altarpieces, worked in wood and covered with gold leaf. The style of the altarpieces forms a unit with the architectural ensemble, that is, it is a sample of mid-18th century New Spanish Baroque. The main altarpiece is dedicated to the Immaculate Conception and the patron saints of the city of Taxco de Alarcón: Saint Prisca and Saint Sebastian. It looks like a cascade of superimposed carvings where the tectonic and compositional structure is lost, leaving the whole that wants to be shown as a whole instead of being divided into parts. In the chapels of the transept of the temple there are two other important altarpieces, one dedicated to the Virgin of Guadalupe and the other to the Virgin of the Rosary.

The central themes of the construction are: the patron saint Saint Prisca, Saint Sebastian, the evangelists, the shells (which symbolize the baptism of Jesus), the laurel leaves (which symbolize the triumph of faith) and the grapes, which represent the blood of Christ. Inside there are paintings by Miguel Cabrera, called "the divine", an Oaxacan painter born in the 17th century, to whom José de la Borda commissioned the paintings that decorate the building. In this church Miguel Cabrera painted Martyrdom of St. Sebastian, Martyrdom of St. Prisca, and also a great Assumption which still hangs in the sacristy.

The oldest document of the parish archive dates from 1598.

== Legend of Santa Prisca ==
There is a legend associated with the Santa Prisca Church. While it was in construction, José de la Borda left Taxco on business to Guanajuato, leaving construction work to the builders. Soon after Borda left, the sky filled with black clouds and cold winds struck the streets, whistling through the towers of the unfinished church. The dark and cold terrified the workmen as the large storm approached. Suddenly a large bolt of lightning struck showing an undefined black silhouette that was swooping down on the church. Then it struck the cupola of the church, lighting it brilliantly. All of the tile covering the cupola began to shine with strange lights, allowing the inscription "Gloria a Dios en las alturas y paz en la tierra a los hombres de buena voluntad" (Glory to God in the Highest and peace on earth for men with good will) to be seen clearly. The whole town got down on their knees to pray, fearing that angry demons would destroy the church. Floating around the church were flashes of light and above the church appeared a beautiful woman who, smiling and with a peaceful face, caught the following lightning bolts in her hands.

== Gallery ==
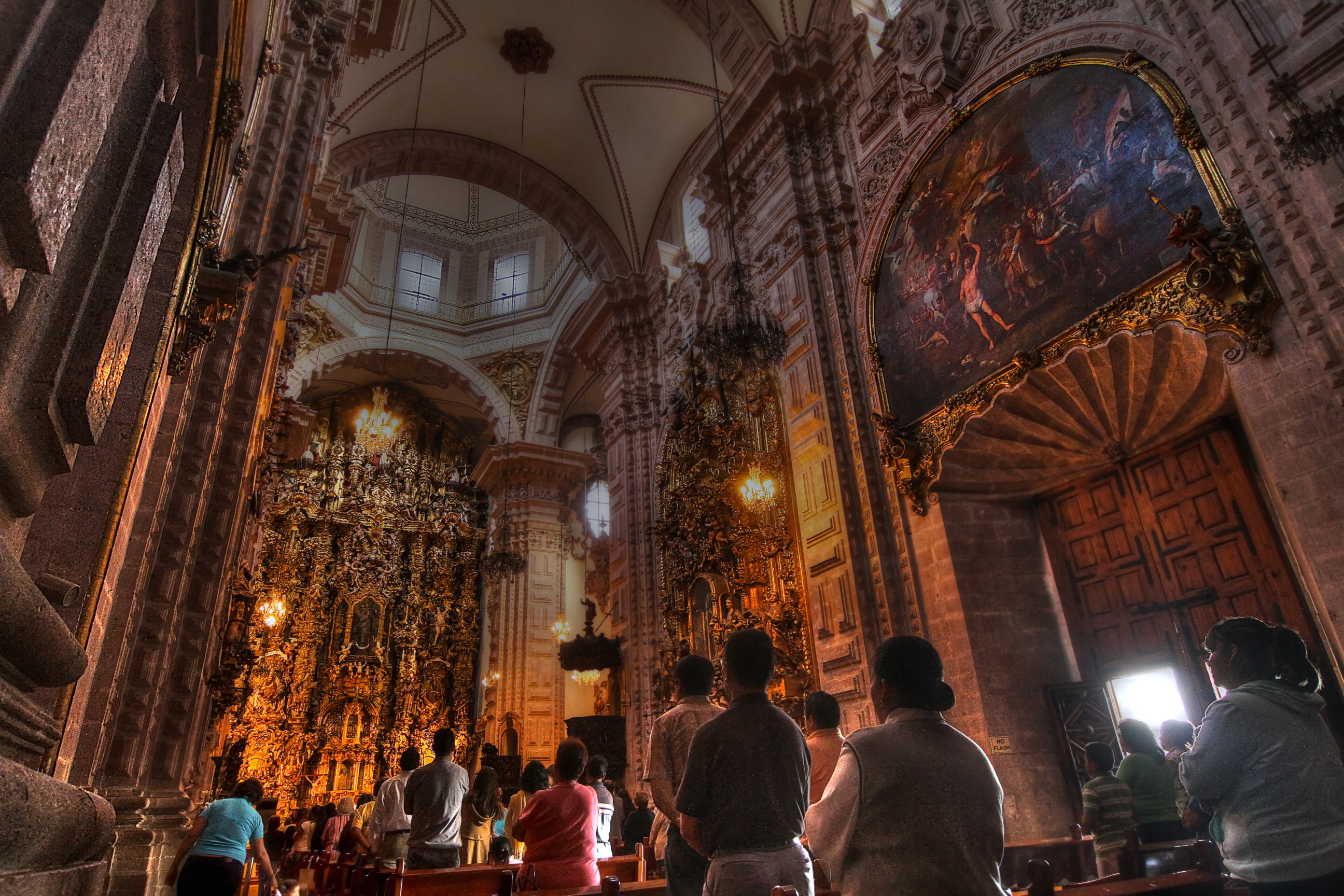
Interior of the temple, Templo de Santa Prisca de Taxco.

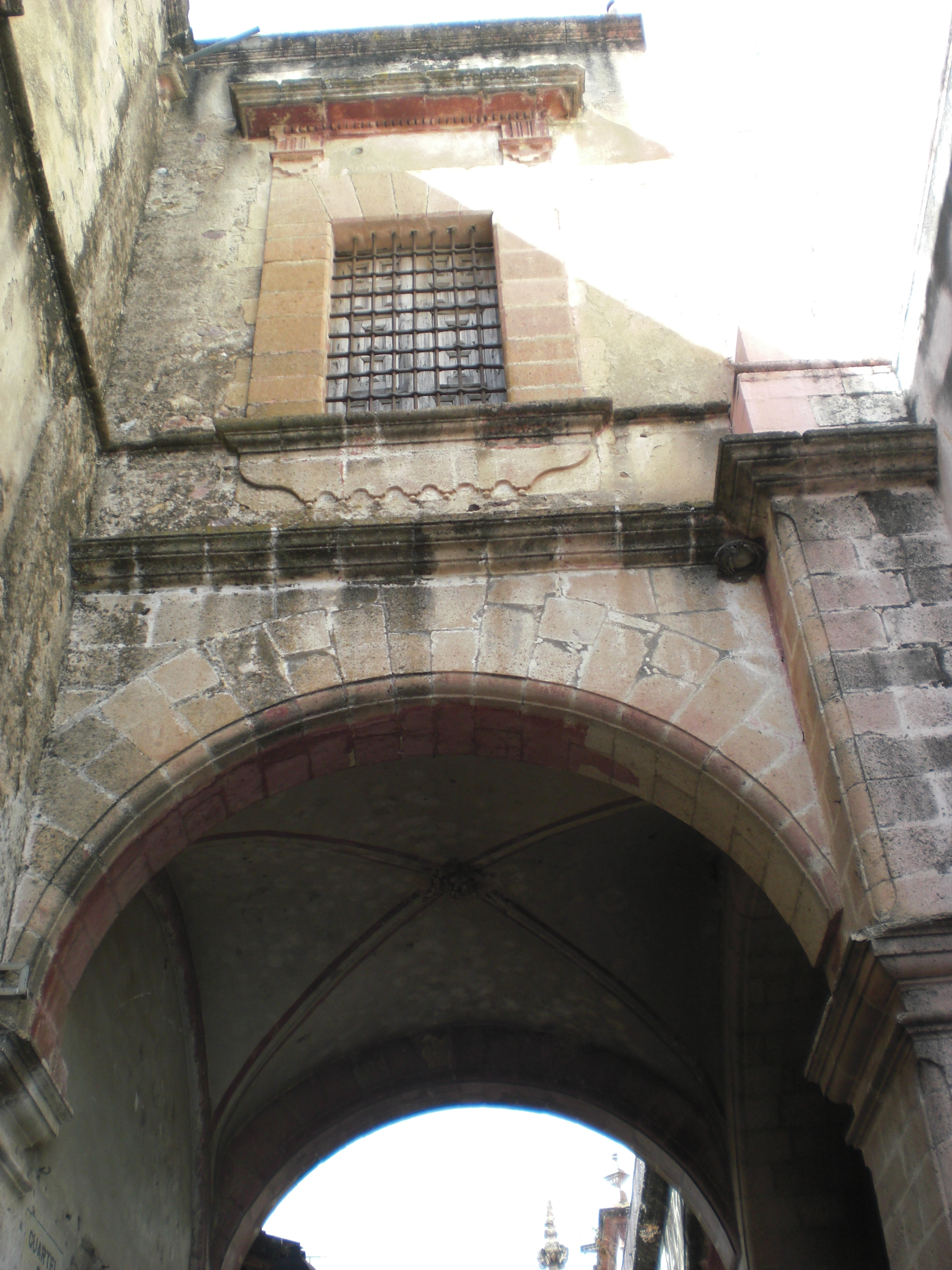
The passageway to the Sagrario on Calle del Arco.

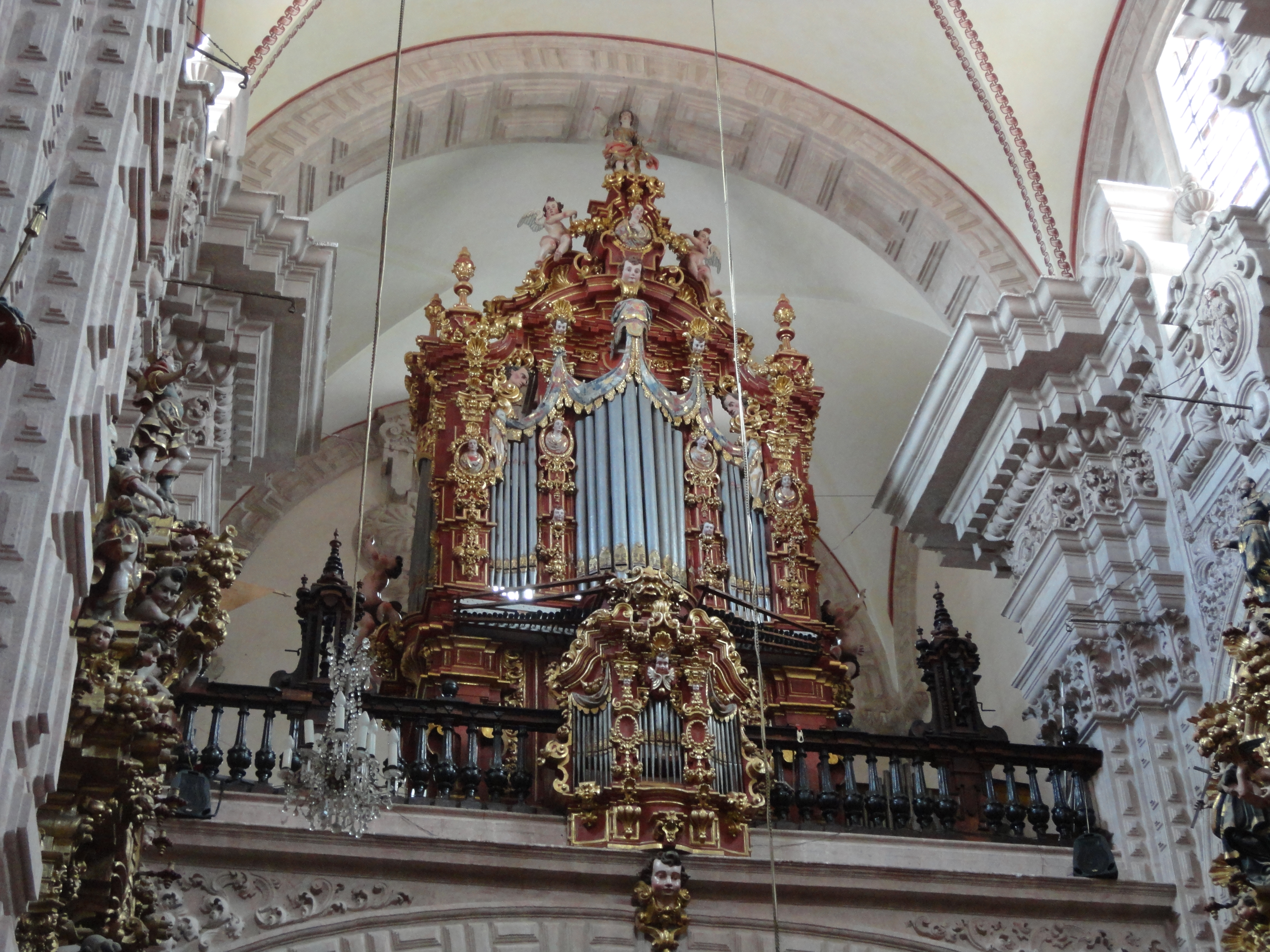
Choir.

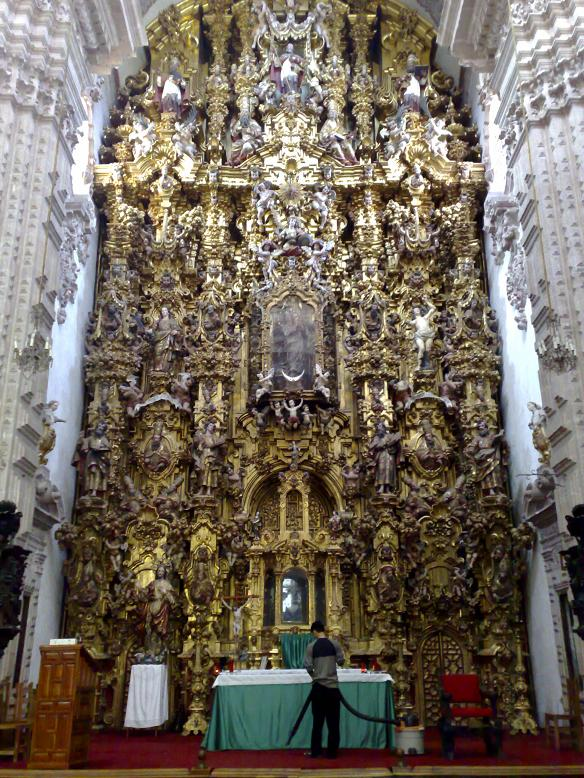
Altarpiece.

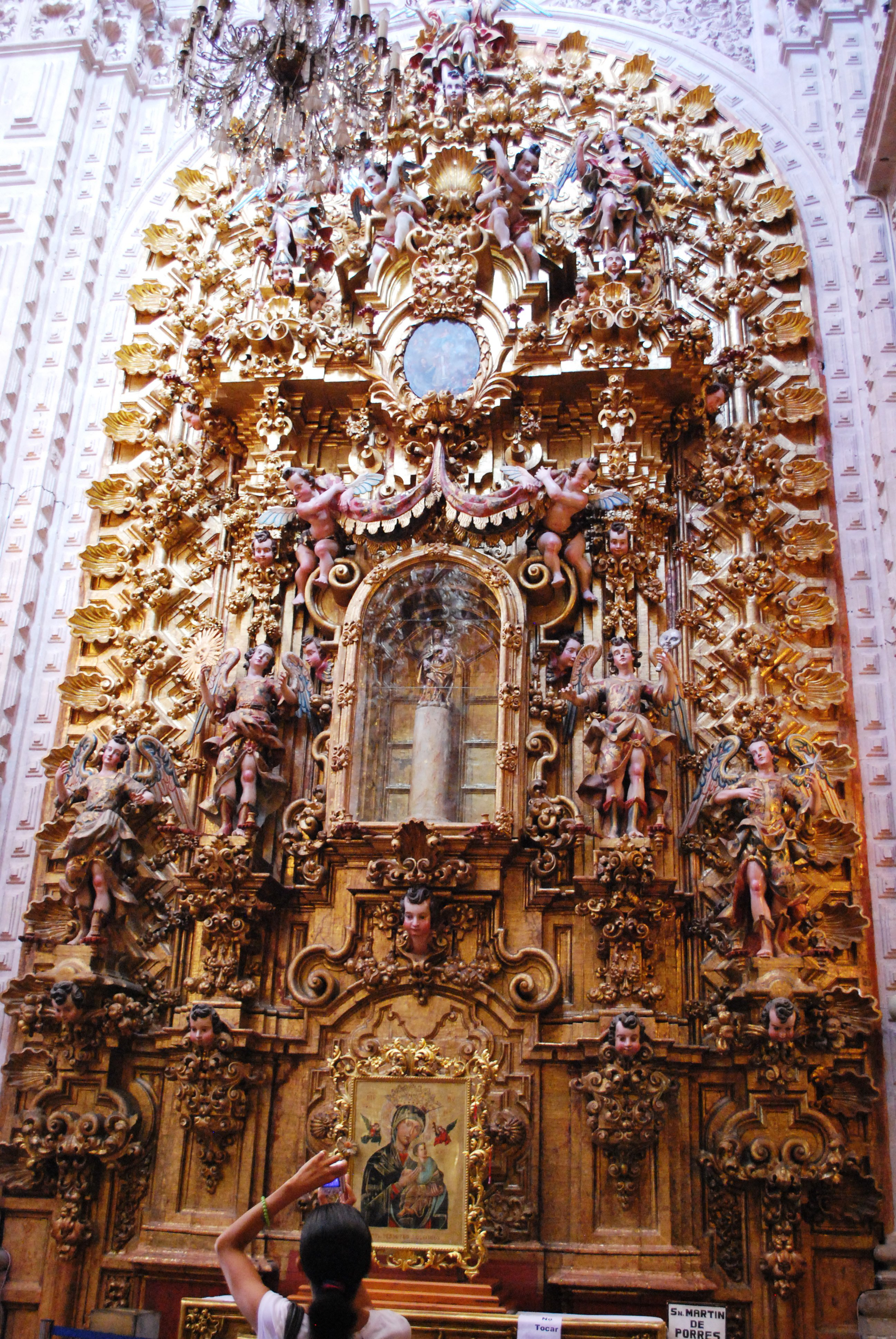
Reredos

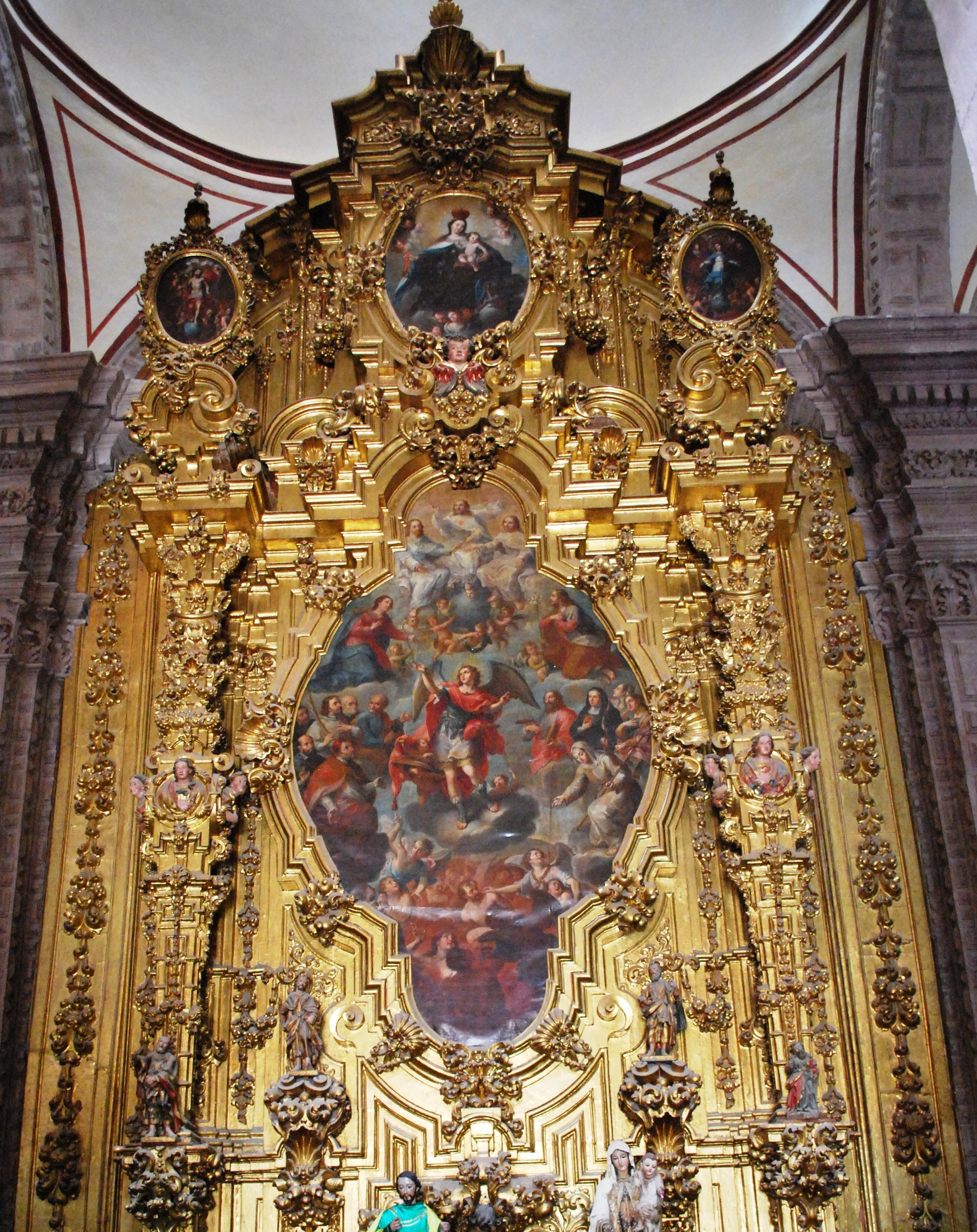
Reredos

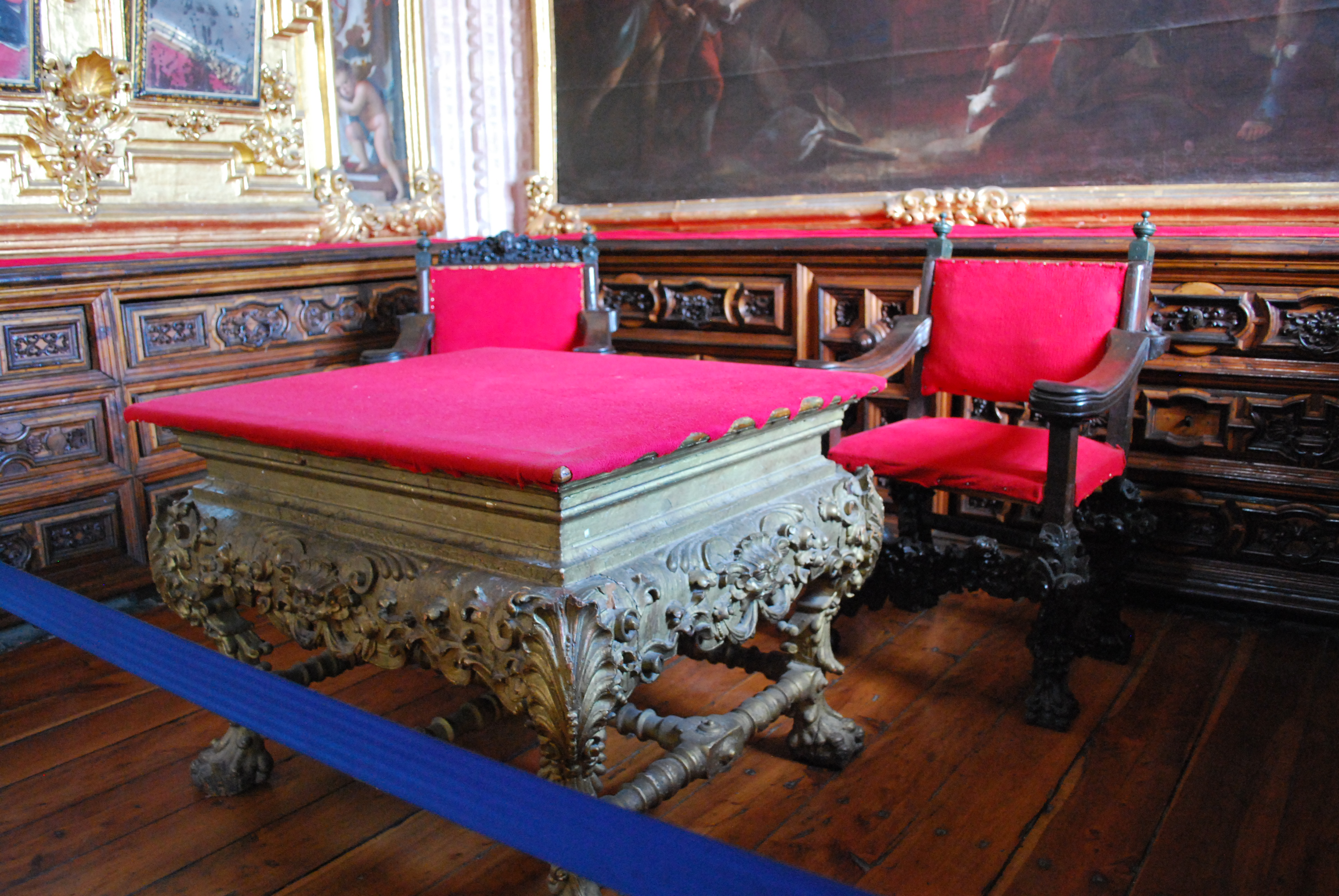
Sacristy furniture.

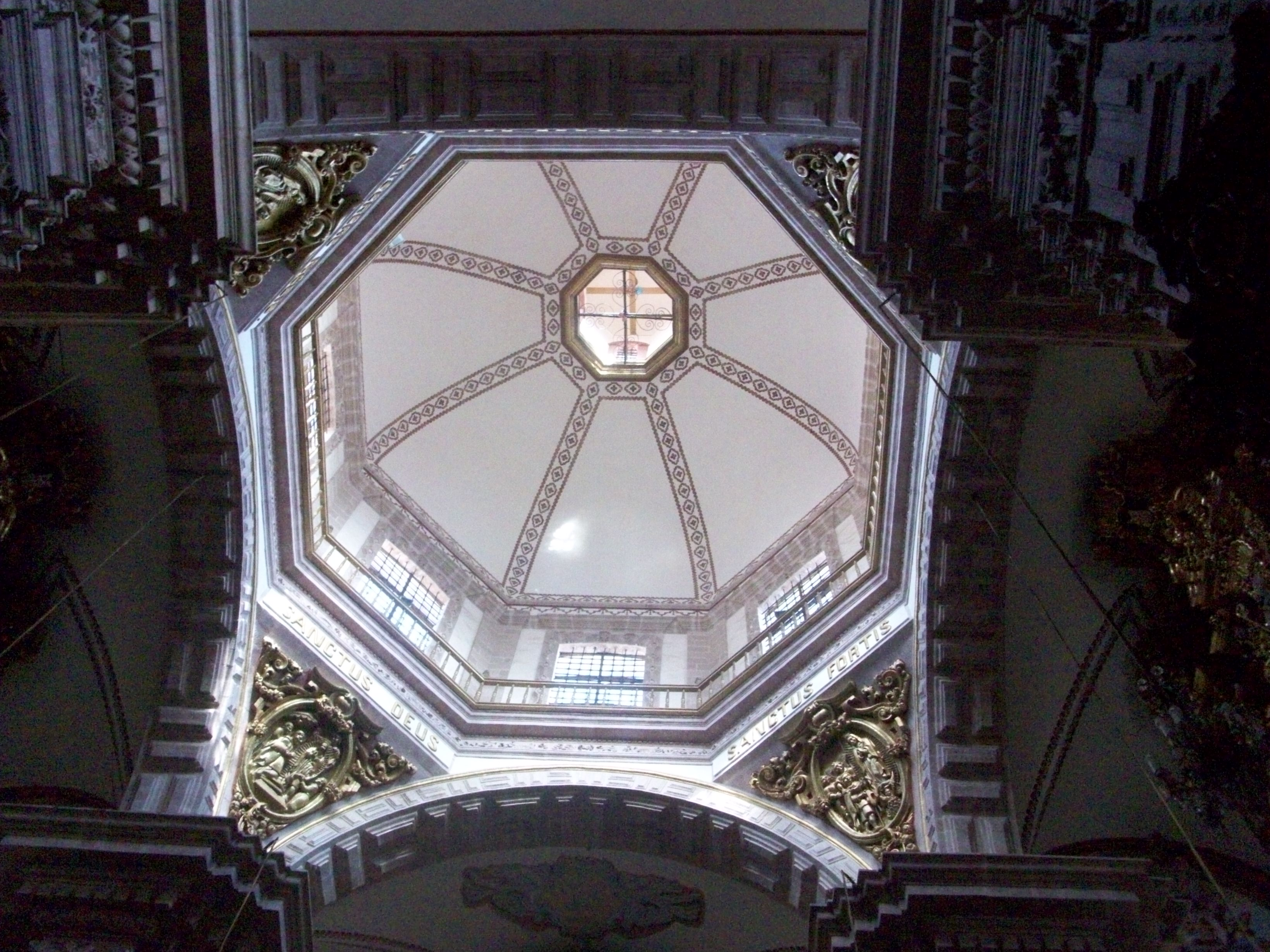
Dome.

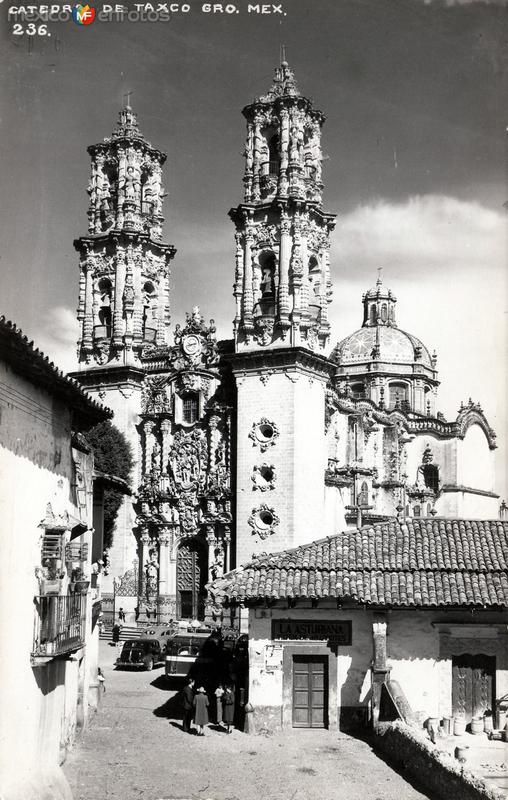
Church of Santa Prisca de Taxco in the 1940s.

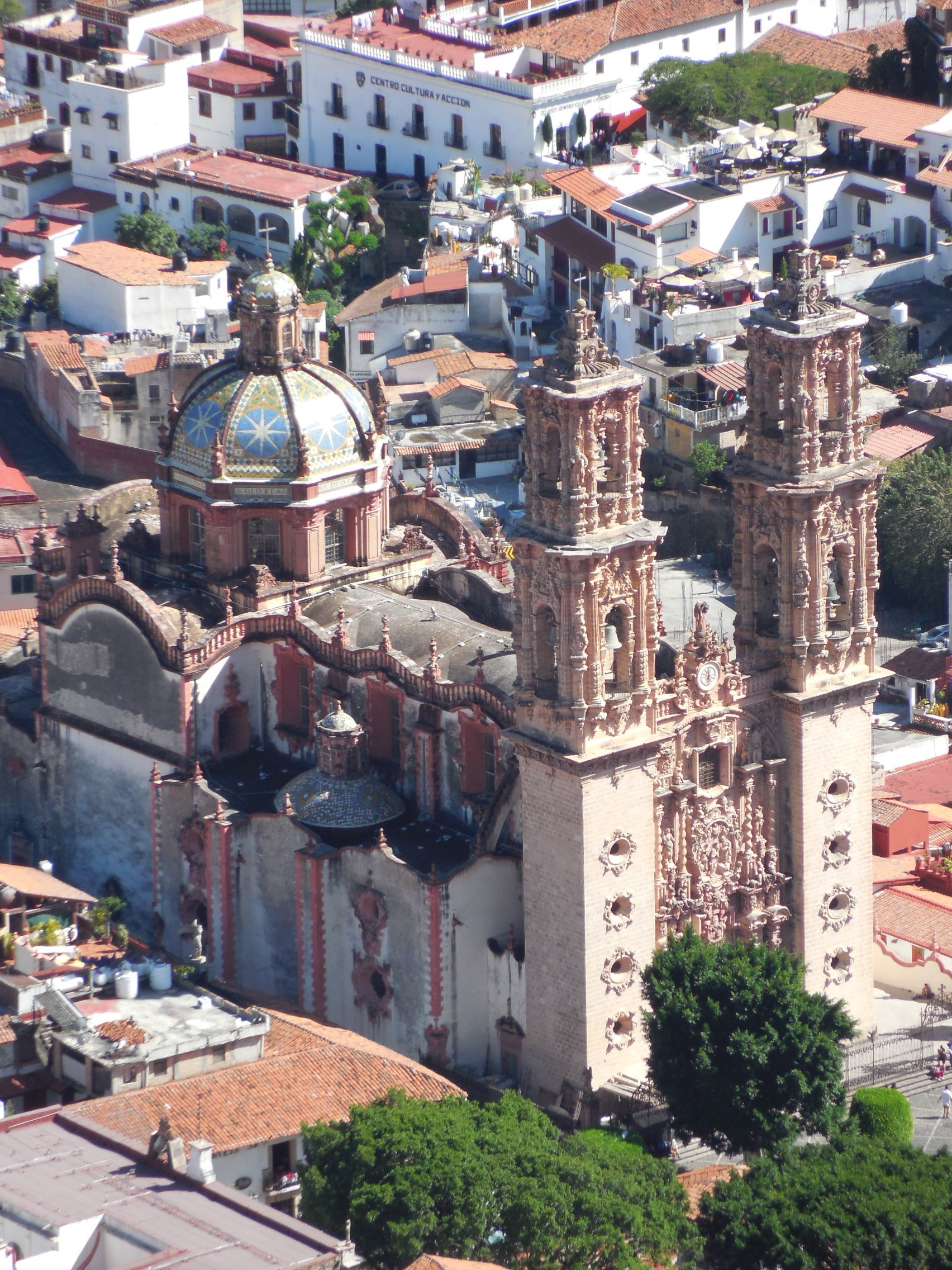
Roof

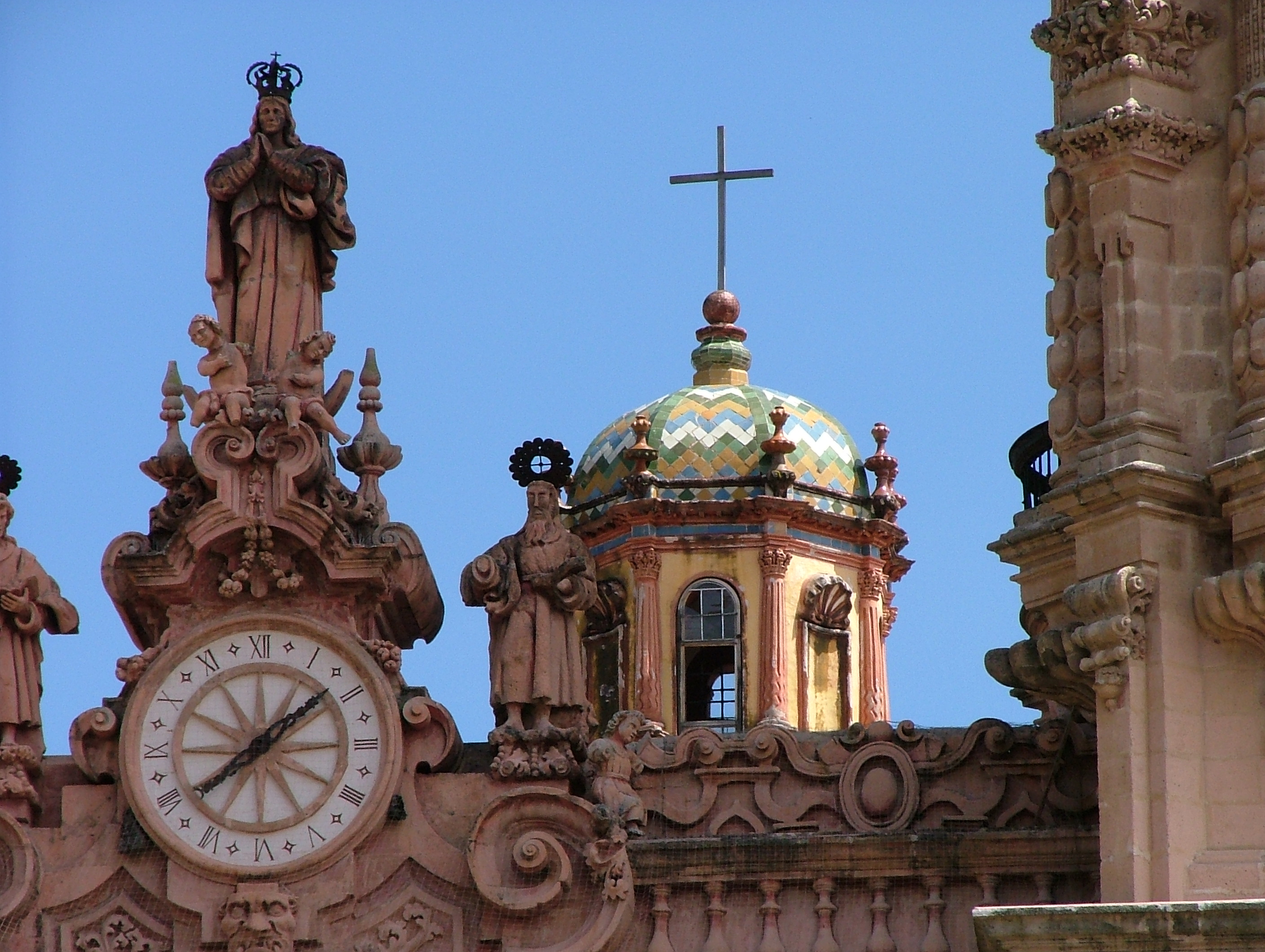
Upper facade

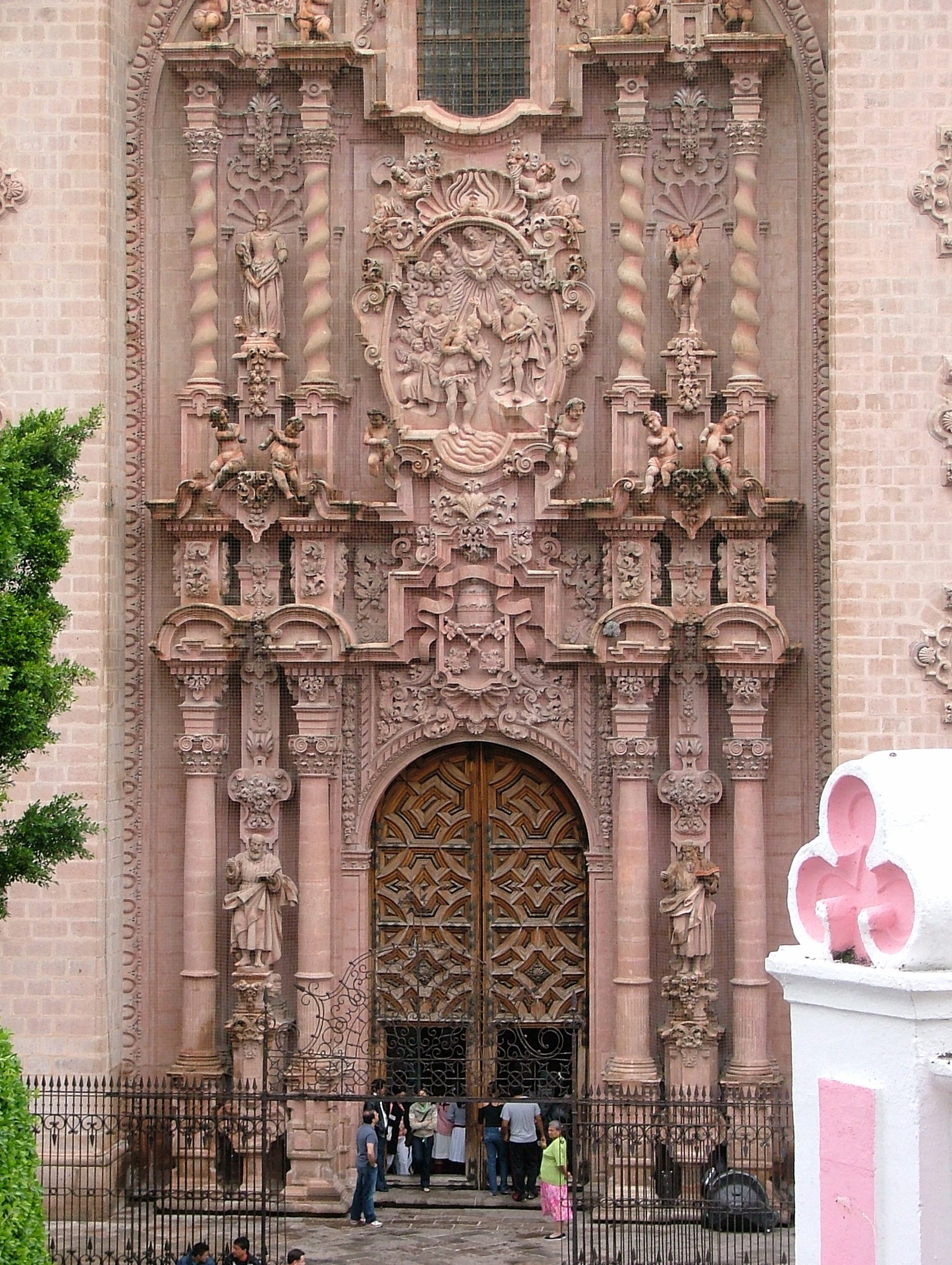
The portal

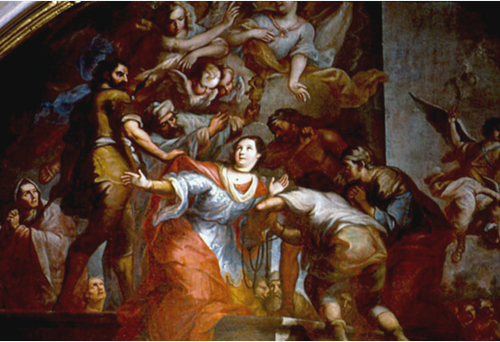
The Martyrdom of St. Prisca (1760) by Miguel Cabrera. Located inside.

== See also ==
- Taxco
- New Spanish Baroque
