= Chapel of the Rosario, Puebla =

Ornate New Spanish Baroque chapel in Mexico

Coordinates: 19°2′47.3208″N 98°11′53.6136″W

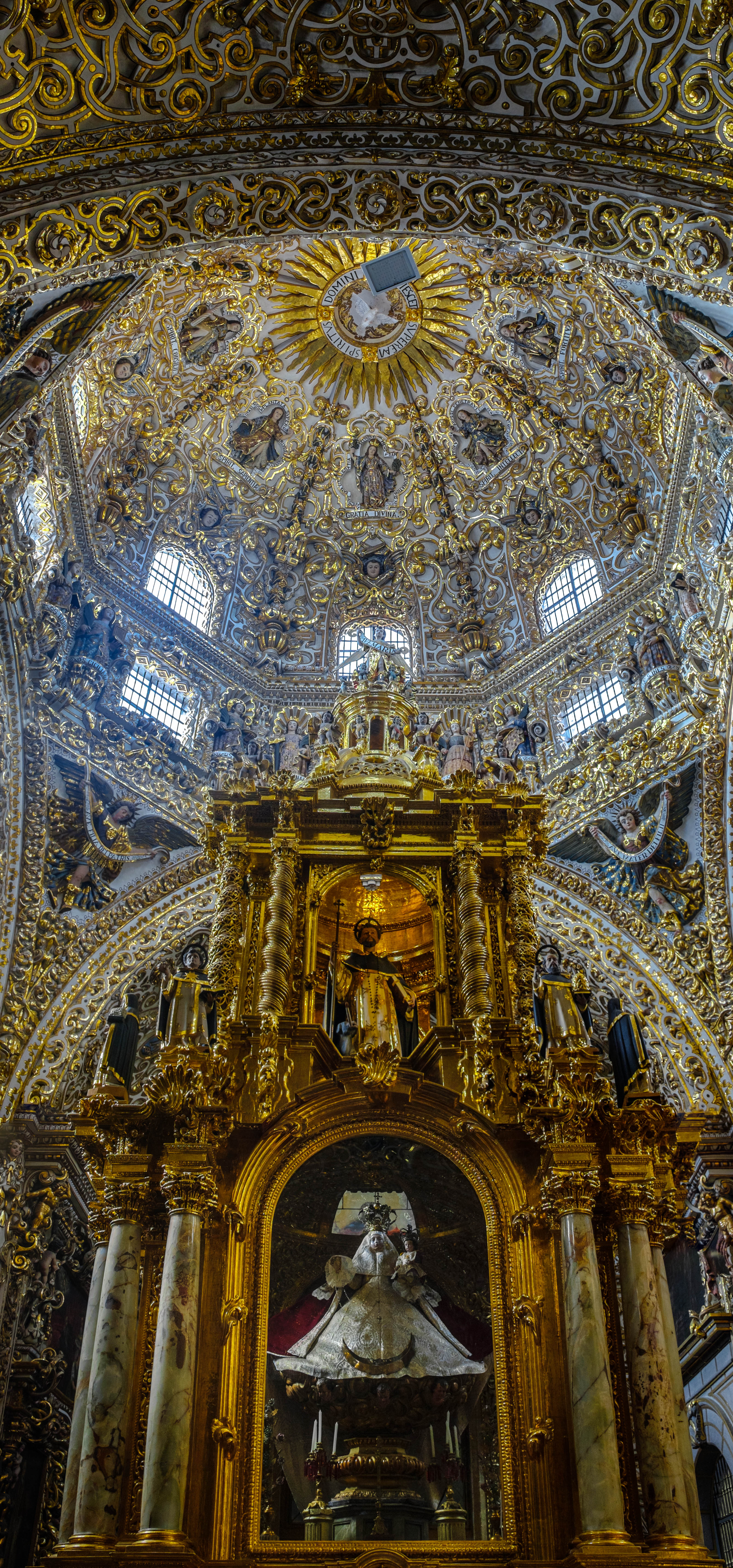

The Chapel of the Rosario, located within the Templo de Santo Domingo in Puebla, Mexico, is an example of 17th-century New Spanish Baroque architecture. It has been called a candidate for eight wonder of the world.

== History ==
Built between 1650 and 1690, it was the first chapel in Mexico dedicated to the Virgin of the Rosary. Known as "The House of Gold" and called the "eighth wonder of the world," its interior features gold leaf, stucco reliefs, and symbolic religious art. Highlights include a gilded dome with 60 angelic figures and an ornate altar honoring the Virgin Mary.
