= New Spanish Baroque =

Baroque art in the Viceroyalty of New Spain

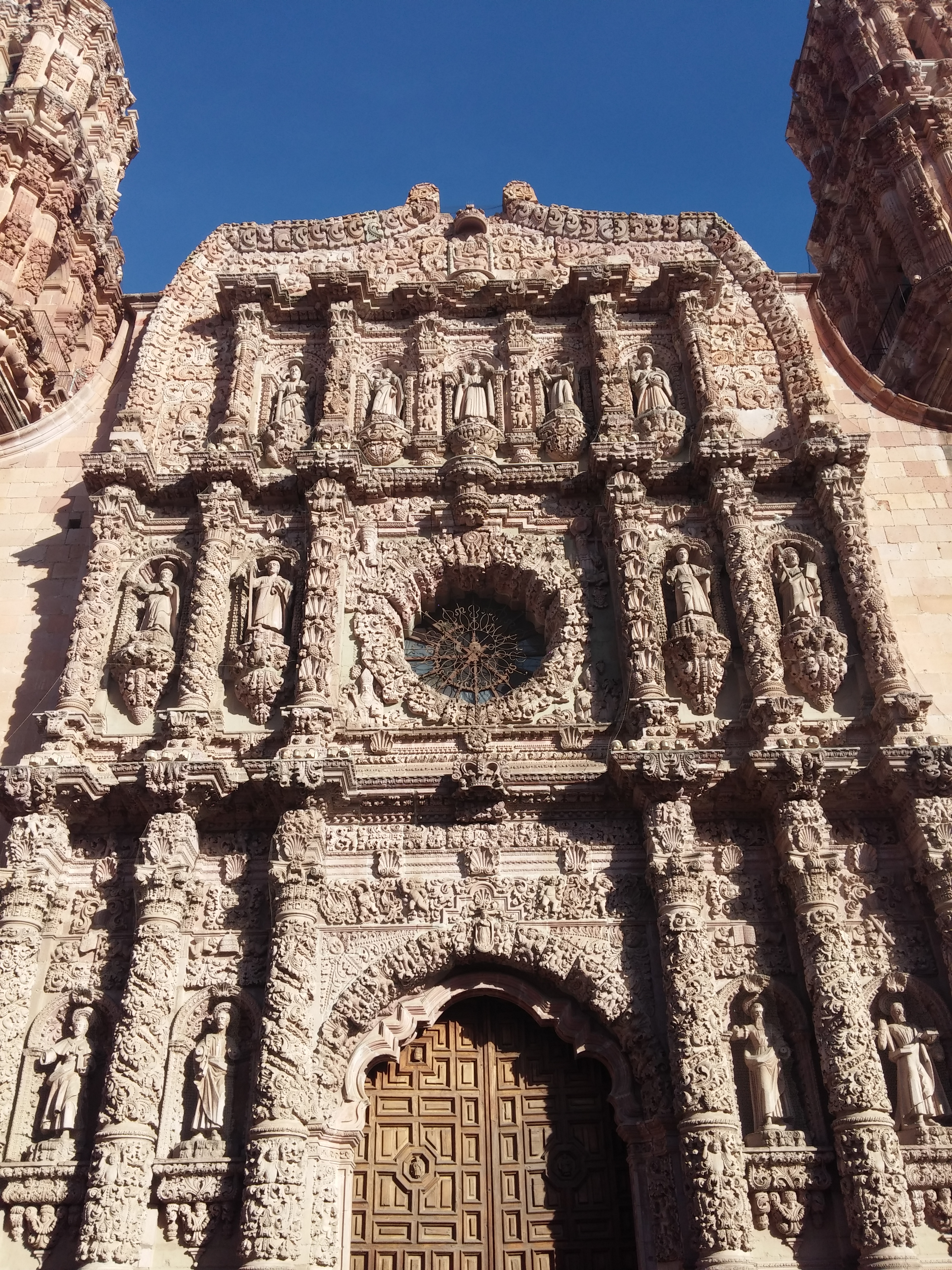
The main façade of the Zacatecas Cathedral, considered a masterpiece of Churrigueresque

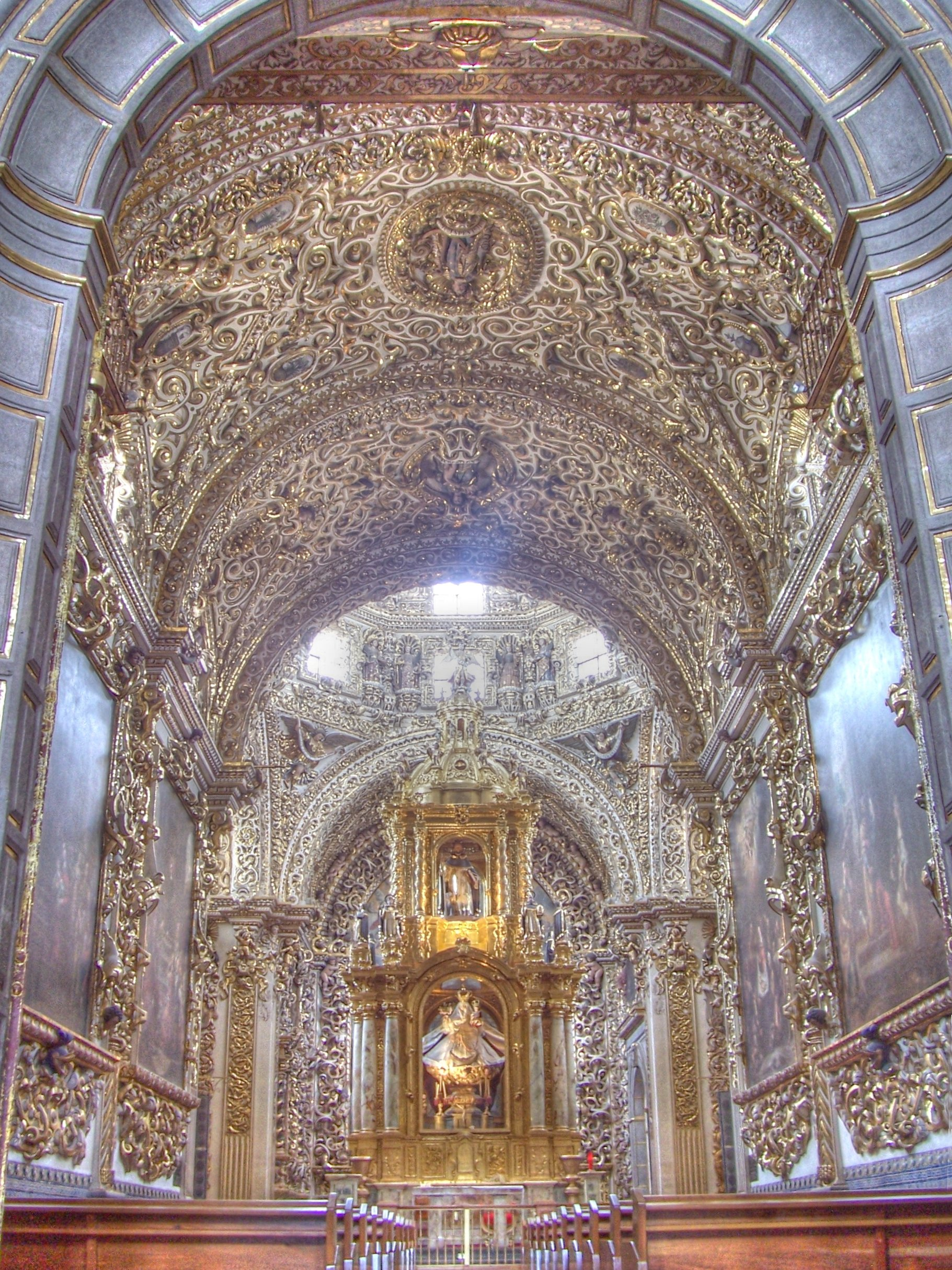
Chapel of the Rosary, Puebla City, once known as the "eighth wonder of the world".

New Spanish Baroque, also known as Mexican Baroque, refers to Baroque art developed in the entire territories that once formed the Viceroyalty of New Spain. During this period, artists of New Spain experimented with expressive, contrasting, and realistic creative approaches, making art that became highly popular in New Spanish society.

Among notable artworks are polychrome sculptures, which as well as the technical skill they display, reflect the expressiveness and the colour contrasts characteristic of New Spanish Baroque.

Two styles can be traced in the architecture of New Spain: the Salomónico, developed from the mid-17th century, and the Estípite, which began in the early 18th century. The most emblematic substyle of Mexican Baroque architecture is Churrigueresque.

A model of the Cathedral of Puebla represents the architectural magnificence of New Spain. A choir book and a harpsichord of the 18th century highlight the importance of music for the colonial society of the Baroque period in Mexico.

== Painting ==
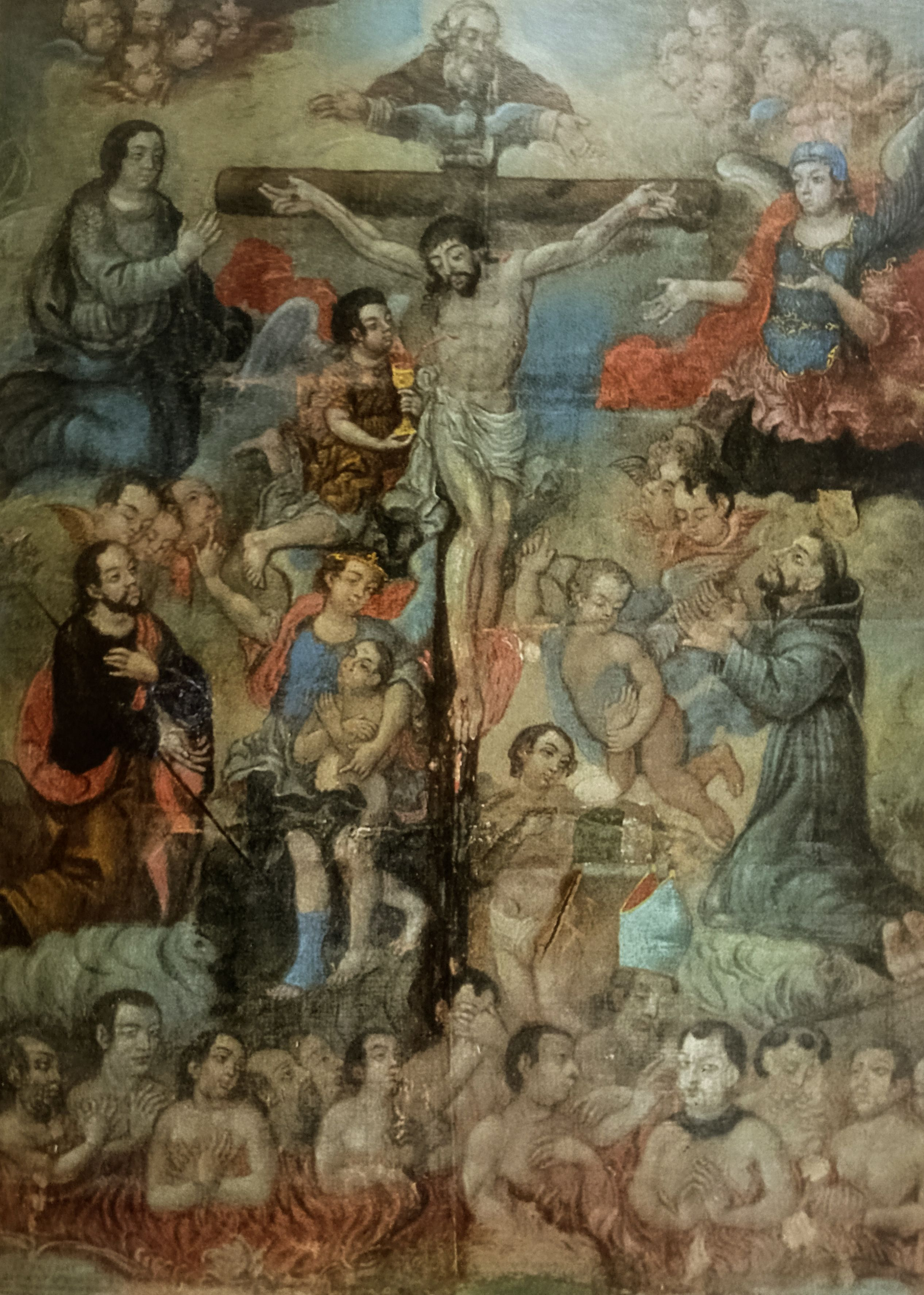
18th century painting showing the crucifixion of Jesus Christ displayed in Santa Lucia church in Honduras.The New Spanish baroque also had a presence in Central America in that time, forming part of New Spain under the name of General Captaincy of Guatemala.

In the realm of painting, New Spanish baroque had great artists whose works are in museums such as the Museum of the Viceroyalty in Tepotzotlán, El Carmen Museum in San Ángel, Santa Mónica Museum in Puebla, and Metropolitan Cathedral in Mexico City.

Among the most distinguished artists were:

- Miguel Cabrera
- Manuel de Arellano
- Juan Correa
- Cristóbal de Villalpando
- Simón Pereyns

=== Simón Pereyns ===
Simón Pereyns lived in Antwerp c. 1530 then Mexico c. 1600. He was a Flemish painter and in 1558, he moved to Lisbon and then to Madrid, where he worked as a court artist.

In 1566, he went to New Spain, achieved fame with his paintings in Mexico. Many works are attributed to him, but most of them have been lost; among those conserved are the ten tables of the altarpiece of Huejotzingo (1586), which revealed the influence of Dürer and his work on Saint Christopher (1585).

Pereyns was put on trial on religious charges. His beliefs were inherited from his ancestors, specifically his father, who was a Lutheran. While he was in prison, he painted a picture called "Our Lady of Atonement", hoping to win a pardon. He was released and donated the painting to the Archbishop of Mexico, whose successors mounted it on the Altar del Perdón at the Metropolitan Cathedral.

=== Juan Correa ===
Juan Correa (1646-1716) was a Novohispanic painter active between 1676 and 1716. His painting covers topics both religious and secular. One of his best works is considered to be the "Assumption of the Virgin" in the Cathedral of Mexico City; several of his works depicting Our Lady of Guadalupe found their way to Spain. He also made paintings of Our Lady of Guadalupe in Rome in 1669.

=== Cristóbal de Villalpando ===
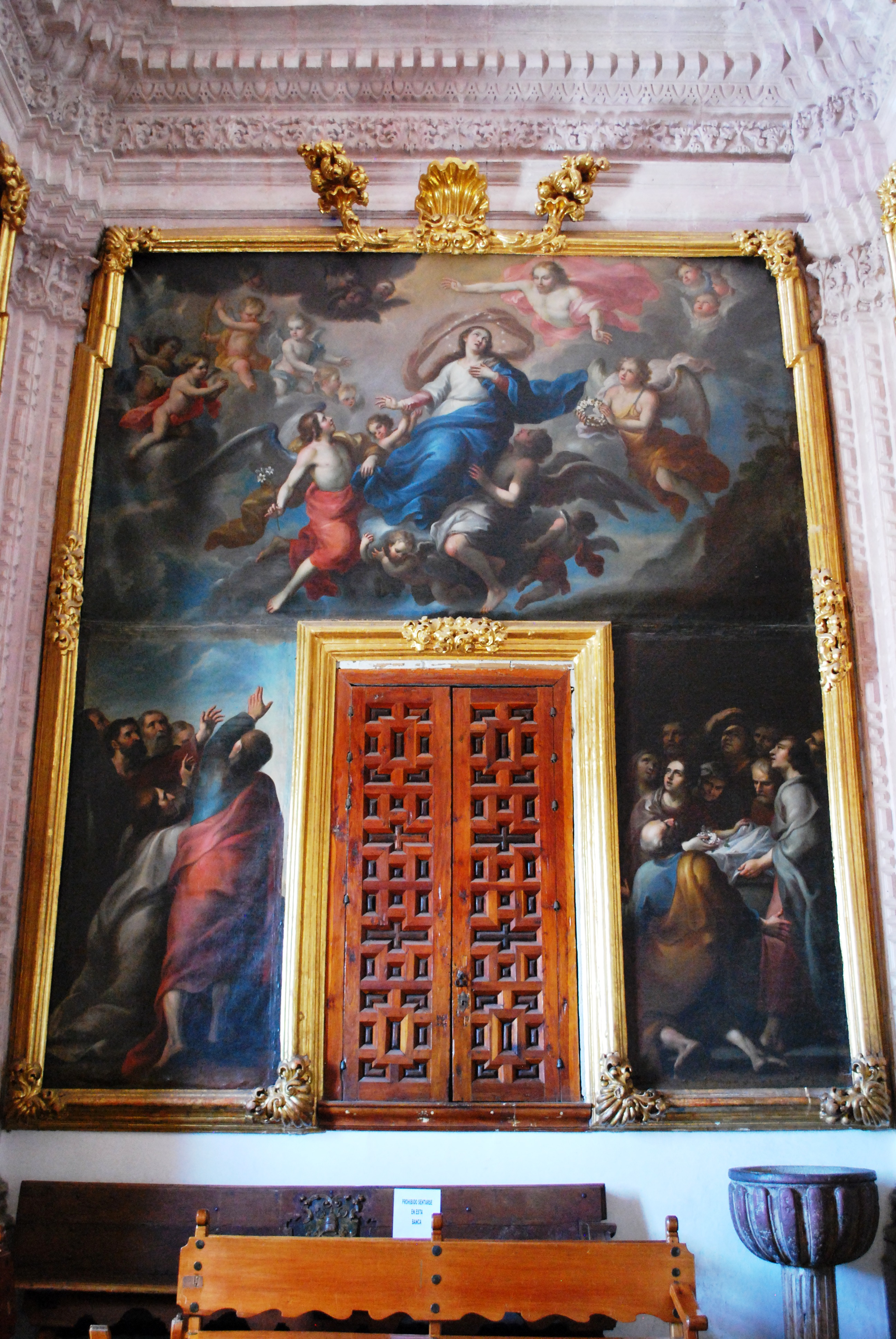
The Assumption of the Virgin, sacristy of the Church of Santa Prisca in Taxco by Cristóbal de Villalpando.

Some of Cristóbal de Villalpando's (c. 1649 – 1714) early work dates from 1675 with the high altar of the Franciscan convent of St. Martin of Tours in Huaquechula, where there are 17 of his paintings; but that is not necessarily the beginning of his career. It is likely that the painter was born in Mexico City in 1649. Little is known about his childhood and adolescence, the earliest documented date being his wedding in 1669. He married María de Mendoza, with whom he had four children.

Undoubtedly, Villalpando was one of the foremost painters of Mexico City during the latter part of the 17th century, as evidenced by the collection of triumphal paintings that were commissioned by the council of the Cathedral of Mexico, for decorating the walls of the sacristy of the church. The canvases prepared for that commission were: The Triumph of the Catholic Church, The Triumph of St. Peter, St. Michael's victory (known as Woman of the Apocalypse) and the appearance of St. Michael on Mount Gargano. Unfortunately, due to structural faults in the vaults of the building, Villalpando was unable to complete the intended set of six paintings; they were completed by Juan Correa.

Due to this hindrance to his work at Mexico City, Villalpando moved to Puebla de los Ángeles where he carried out similar work at the Cathedral there. He produced a well-known oil painting titled "Glorification of the Virgin", in the dome of the Chapel de Los Reyes located in the end wall of the church. It is also worth noting the amount of his work found in the church of the Profesa in Mexico City. His importance was recognized by the painters' guild, of which he became leader on several occasions. He reached old age with a great reputation, and he was recognized as an important stylistic influence on later generations. He is considered one of the last exponents of Baroque painting in New Spain: after his death New Spanish plastic art took a different path.

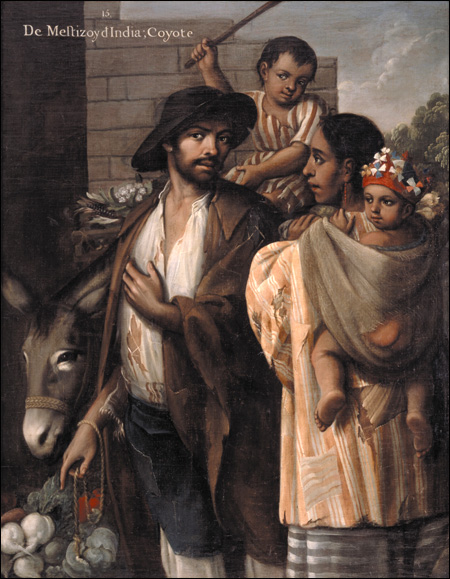
Casta painting by Miguel Cabrera, 1763.

=== Miguel Cabrera ===
Miguel Cabrera (1695-1768) was an extraordinarily prolific artist, specialising in depictions of the Virgin Mary and other saints. He is regarded as the leading colourist of the 18th century.

His paintings were very much in demand: many requests for pictures came from convents, churches, palaces, and noble houses.

== Writing and philosophy ==
A wide range of poets and writers fell within the New Spanish Baroque tradition. For poems and writings there is a wide variety of characters. During the Baroque, Spanish literature and that of New Spain began to resemble each other more. Many great Spanish authors intended to travel to America, such as Cervantes or San Juan de la Cruz, although they did not succeed for various reasons. However, writers like Tirso de Molina or Juan de la Cueva did. Stylistically, baroque literature had as its main feature contrast, paradoxes and contradictions in the language and themes used.Like wise, word games, anagrams, symbols or emblems were very frequent. This is a literary style with a great presence of exaggeration.

=== Gutierre de Cetina ===
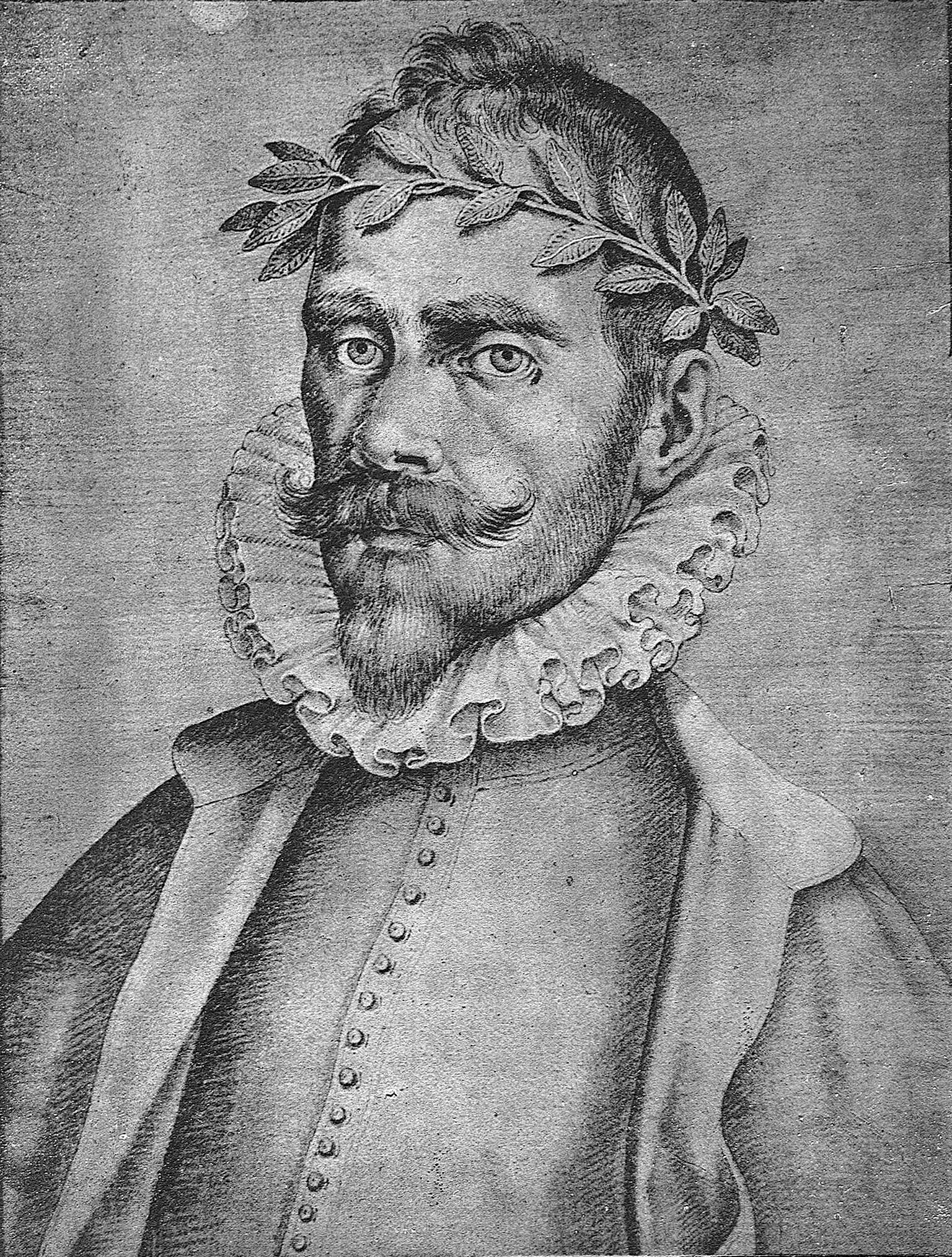
Portrait of Gutierre de Cetina.

Gutierre de Cetina (1520 - 1557) was a Spanish poet of the Renaissance and the Spanish Golden Age. He was born in Seville, Spain and died in the Viceroyalty of New Spain. Of a noble and wealthy family, he lived for a long time in Italy, where he was a soldier under the command of Charles I. Spending much time in the court of the Prince of Ascoli, to whom he dedicated numerous poems, and also associated with Luis de Leyva and distinguished humanist and poet Diego Hurtado de Mendoza. He adopted the nickname "Vandalio" and composed a song in the Petrarchan style to a beautiful woman named Laura Gonzaga. To such a woman was dedicated the famous madrigal that has been included in all anthologies of poetry in the Spanish language:

Eyes clear, calm,
Since you are praised for your tender gaze,
Why, when you look at me, do you look angry?

In the same songbook there are many sonnets whose pattern was essentially the rendering of a loving thought of Petrarch or Ausiàs March in the quartets, and a further, more personal development in the tercets.

In 1554 Cetina returned to Spain and in 1556 went to Mexico; he had previously been there between 1546 and 1548, with his uncle Gonzalo Lopez, who had gone there as chief accountant. He fell in love again, with Leonor de Osma, and was mortally wounded in 1557 in Puebla de los Angeles by an envious rival, Hernando de Nava.

=== Juan Ruiz de Alarcón y Mendoza ===
Juan Ruiz de Alarcón y Mendoza (c.1581 - 1639) was born in Taxco. He was a Novohispanic writer of the Golden Age who developed various forms of drama. His works include the comedy "La Verdad Sospechosa" (Suspicious Truth), which is one of the most important works of Spanish American Baroque theater, comparable to the best pieces of Lope de Vega or Tirso de Molina.

Little is known about the early life of Ruiz de Alarcón. It is known that his maternal grandfather was Jewish and his paternal grandfather was the son of a priest of La Mancha and a Moorish slave. It is probable that he came from a family well connected with the Castilian nobility. He studied from 1596 to 1598 in the Royal and Pontifical University of Mexico. About 1600 he set off for the University of Salamanca, where he studied civil law and specialized in canon law.

While in Salamanca, Alarcón rose to prominence as the author of dramas and stories. In 1606 he went to Seville in order to practice commercial and canonical law. There, he met Miguel de Cervantes, who was subsequently influenced by his works, including La cueva de Salamanca (The Cave of Salamanca) and "El Semejante A Sí Mismo" (Like unto Himself).

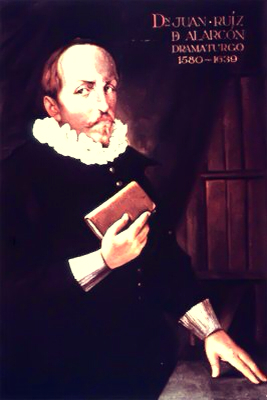
Juan Ruiz de Alarcón.

In the first months of 1607 he returned to New Spain. Two years later he obtained a bachelor's degree in law and several times tried unsuccessfully to gain a university chair. His next move was to Madrid, where he began the most fruitful period of his literary output. His early works were "Las Paredes Oyen" (Walls Have Ears) and "Los Pechos Privilegiados" (The Privileged), both meeting with some success. He soon came to be recognised in literary circles in Madrid, but never established close relations with any of their members. Indeed, he earned the hostility of others. We know of many satirical quatrains and disguised allusions to Alarcón, who was always ridiculed for his physique - he was a hunchback - and his American origins. He, in turn, responded to the vast majority of personal attacks and never stopped writing.

It has been suggested that he may have collaborated with Tirso de Molina, one of the most famous writers of his time and the one who most influenced his works. There are no written evidence of such a collaboration, although it is thought that at least two of the comedies of Tirso, published in the second volume of his works (Madrid, 1635), were in fact written by or with the collaboration of Alarcón.

With the accession of Philip IV, in 1621, the theater achieved an important place in the royal court. Alarcón soon struck up a useful friendship with the son-in-law of the powerful Gaspar de Guzmán, Count-Duke of Olivares, Ramiro Felipe de Guzmán, under whose patronage he grew better-known as a poet. Between 1622 and 1624 he wrote "La Amistad Castigada" (Punished Friendship) and "El dueño de las estrellas" (The Owner of the Stars) as well as the vast majority of his plays. From 1625 he served on the Council of the Indies, thanks to the intercession of his friend Ramiro Felipe de Guzmán.

During the first months of 1639, Alarcón's health began to deteriorate. He stopped attending the council's meetings and was replaced in his position as rapporteur. In August he dictated his will, making provision for all his debts and debtors. He died on August 4, 1639, and was buried in the parish of San Sebastián.

=== Carlos de Sigüenza y Góngora ===
Carlos de Sigüenza y Góngora (1645 - 1700) was the youngest son of eight children and was related to the famous Baroque Culteranismo poet Luis de Góngora. His father was a tutor to the royal family in Spain; after he emigrated to the New World he joined the bureaucracy of the viceroyalty.

In 1662, Sigüenza entered the Jesuit college of Tepotzotlán to begin his religious studies, which he continued in Puebla. In 1667 he was expelled from the order for indiscipline. He returned to Mexico City and entered the Royal and Pontifical University of Mexico. In 1672 he took the post of professor of mathematics and astrology, the position that Diego Rodríguez had occupied thirty years before. Sigüenza held this position for the next twenty years. In 1681, he wrote a book, "A Philosophical Manifesto", concerning comets, in an attempt to calm the superstitious fears arising from this cosmic phenomenon. A Jesuit, Eusebio Kino, strongly criticized this text from an Aristotelian and Thomistic point of view; but, far from being intimidated, Sigüenza responded by publishing his work "Libra astronómica y philosóphica" (1690). Here he rigorously justified his view of comets, referring to the most current scientific knowledge of his time; against the Thomism and Aristotelianism of Father Kino he quoted authors like Copernicus, Galileo, Descartes, Kepler and Tycho Brahe.

Until recently it had been thought that another of his works, "Los infortunios de Alonso Ramírez" (1690), describing the adventures of a Puerto Rican named Alonso Ramírez, was a mere fiction invented by the famous Mexican intellectual. It has now been shown to be a historical account. [See article on Siguenza y Gongora]

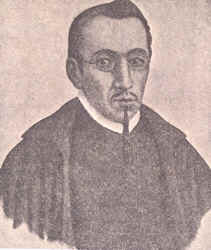
Carlos de Sigüenza y Góngora.

The heavy rains of 1691 flooded the fields and threatened to flood the city; the wheat crop was devastated by a disease. Sigüenza used a precursor of the microscope to discover that the cause of this disease in wheat was the Chiahuiztli, an insect like the flea. As a result of this disaster, the following year there was a severe shortage of food which caused large-scale rioting. Mobs looted Spaniards' shops and caused numerous fires in government buildings. Sigüenza managed to salvage the city library from the fire, avoiding a great loss. Sigüenza estimated that about ten thousand people took part in the riot. As the royal cosmographer of New Spain he drew hydrologic maps of the Valley of Mexico. In 1693 he was sent by the viceroy as a companion of Andrés de Pez in an exploration trip to the north of the Gulf of Mexico and in particular the peninsula of Florida, where he drew maps of Pensacola Bay and the mouth of the Mississippi River. This experience may have inspired him to write about marine adventure in the "Misfortunes of Alonso Ramirez".

In his later years he spent much time collecting material for a history of ancient Mexico. Unfortunately, his untimely death interrupted the work, which was not resumed until centuries later when criolla self-awareness had developed enough to be interested in the identity of their nation. Sigüenza had directed that upon his death, his valuable library with more than 518 books would be donated to a Jesuit school, and his body handed over to medical research in order to find a cure for the disease that caused his death.

=== Sor Juana Inés de la Cruz ===
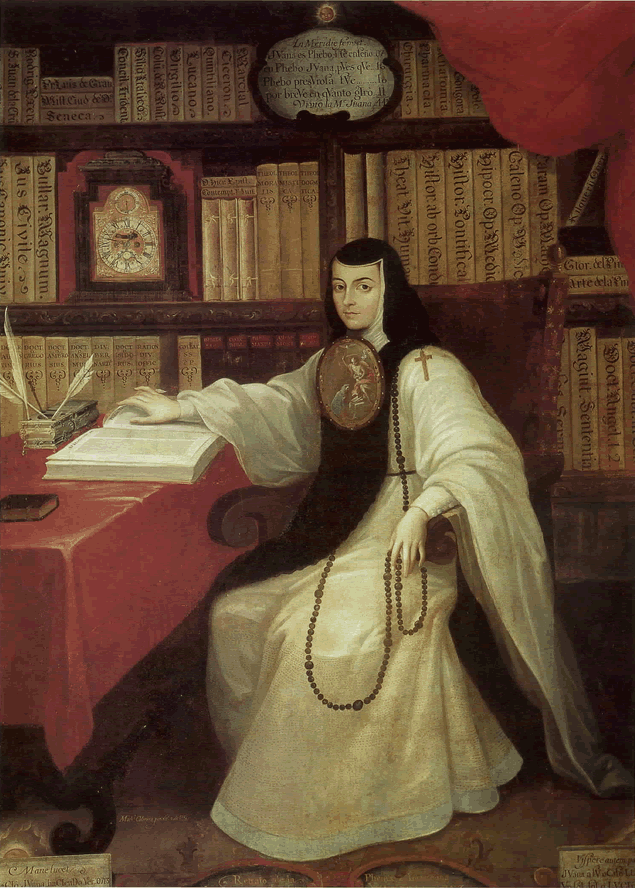
Sor Juana Inés de la Cruz, Baroque music composer, philosopher and poet, portrait by Miguel Cabrera.

Sor Juana Inés de la Cruz (1651 - 1695), known as the "Tenth Muse", was born on 12 November 1651 in San Miguel Nepantla and died in Mexico City on April 17, 1695. She was one of the greatest writers during the Golden Age. Her passion for literature began in childhood, but as a woman, she could not get into university, so she started to write poetry, pieces of music, sonnets, ten-line stanzas and books. She first entered the Carmelite order, but decided to change to the Jerónimas in the Convento de San Jerónimo (Mexico City), which is now University of the Cloister of Sor Juana. Her works included "Redondillas" and "Al que ingrato me deja" (To the one who ungratefully leaves me). She composed a poem which became a Christmas carol called "¡Ah de las mazmorras!" (Ah dungeons!). She was on the verge of condemnation by the Spanish Inquisition, because at that time women were not thought fit to philosophize. There was presumed to be a lesbian relationship between Sor Juana and Viceroy María Luisa Manrique de Lara y Gonzaga yet there was no certain evidence. It was also alleged that she was a feminist, citing her accusations against men and her poems such as those mentioned above.

Sor Juana eventually retired from writing and poetry to devote herself to religious work. She became characterized by a famous phrase: "I, the worst of all." In 1695, an epidemic of plague affected the capital of New Spain, including the Convento de San Jerónimo. Sor Juana helped care for the sick until she contracted the plague and died.

== Architecture ==
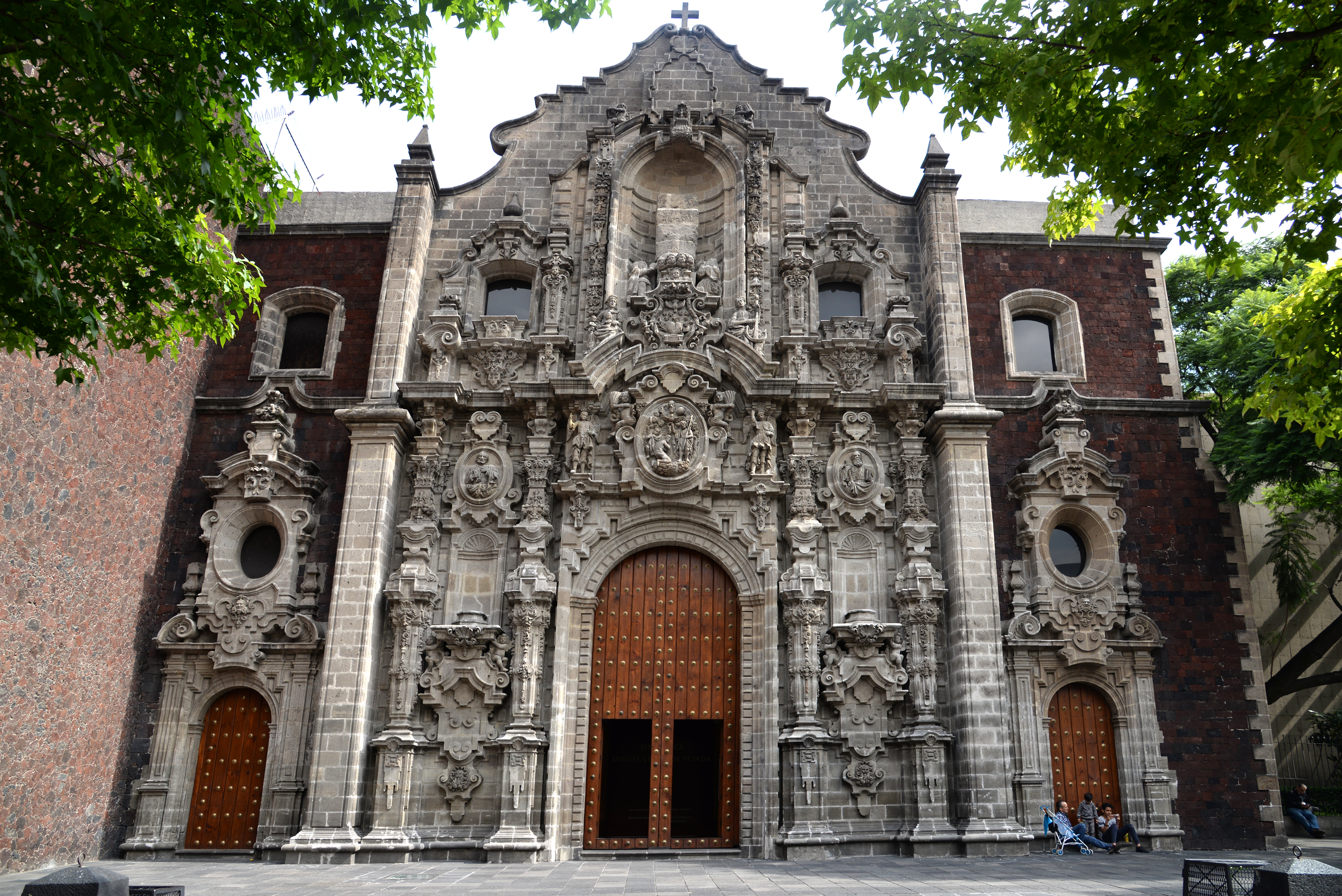
The façade of the Former San Felipe Neri Church shows the ornate decoration popular in 18th century Baroque, as well as the characteristic use of tezontle and cantera stone in buildings of Mexico City.

During the Renaissance in Europe, the Baroque style was born, and that includes artists like Michelangelo, Gian Lorenzo Bernini, Leonardo Da Vinci, Sandro Botticelli or others. Spain had its new baroque style, which built altarpieces with Estípites or Solomonic columns, this style was used to decorate mainly churches, such is the case of the Cathedral of Santa María de la Sede of Seville, the Church of the Holy Spirit La Clerecía (Salamanca), or the Cathedral of Santa Eulalia in Barcelona. After the conquest of New Spain, artists such as Jerónimo de Balbás decorated churches or facades with a mixture of stipes, geometric shapes and altarpieces, and the New Spain Baroque was born.

As previously mentioned, stipes played a crucial role in the decoration of altarpieces, a maximum exponent of the stipe is the Altarpiece of the Kings in the Metropolitan Cathedral of Mexico City built and hand-carved by Jerónimo de Balbas in 1736. In In the same cathedral is the Altar of Forgiveness, also built by Jerónimo de Balbas, 1735, the original was destroyed in a fire in 1965, the current one is an exact replica.

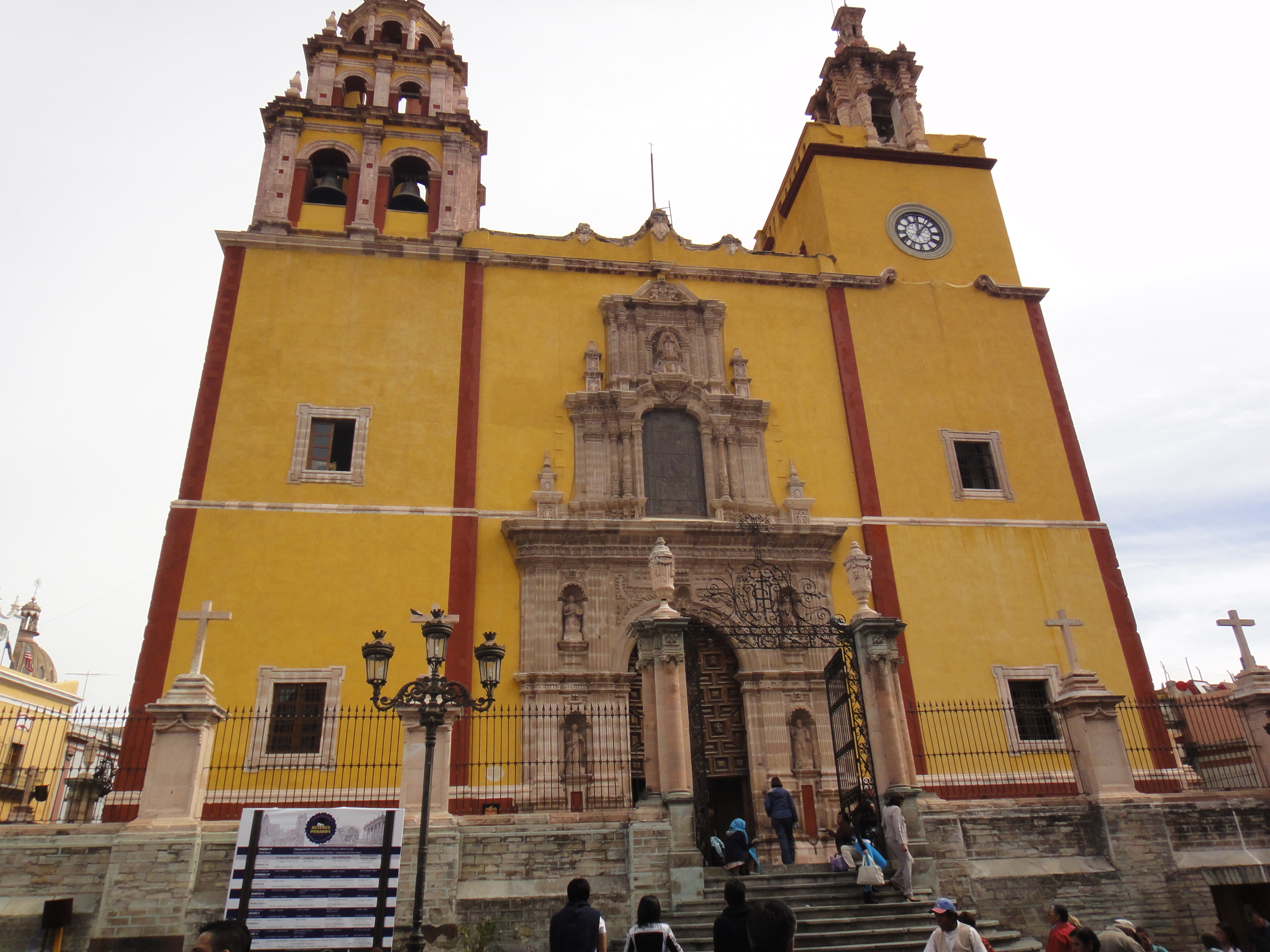
The Basilica of Guanajuato, a 17th-century building reflecting a transitional Mannerism - Baroque architecture

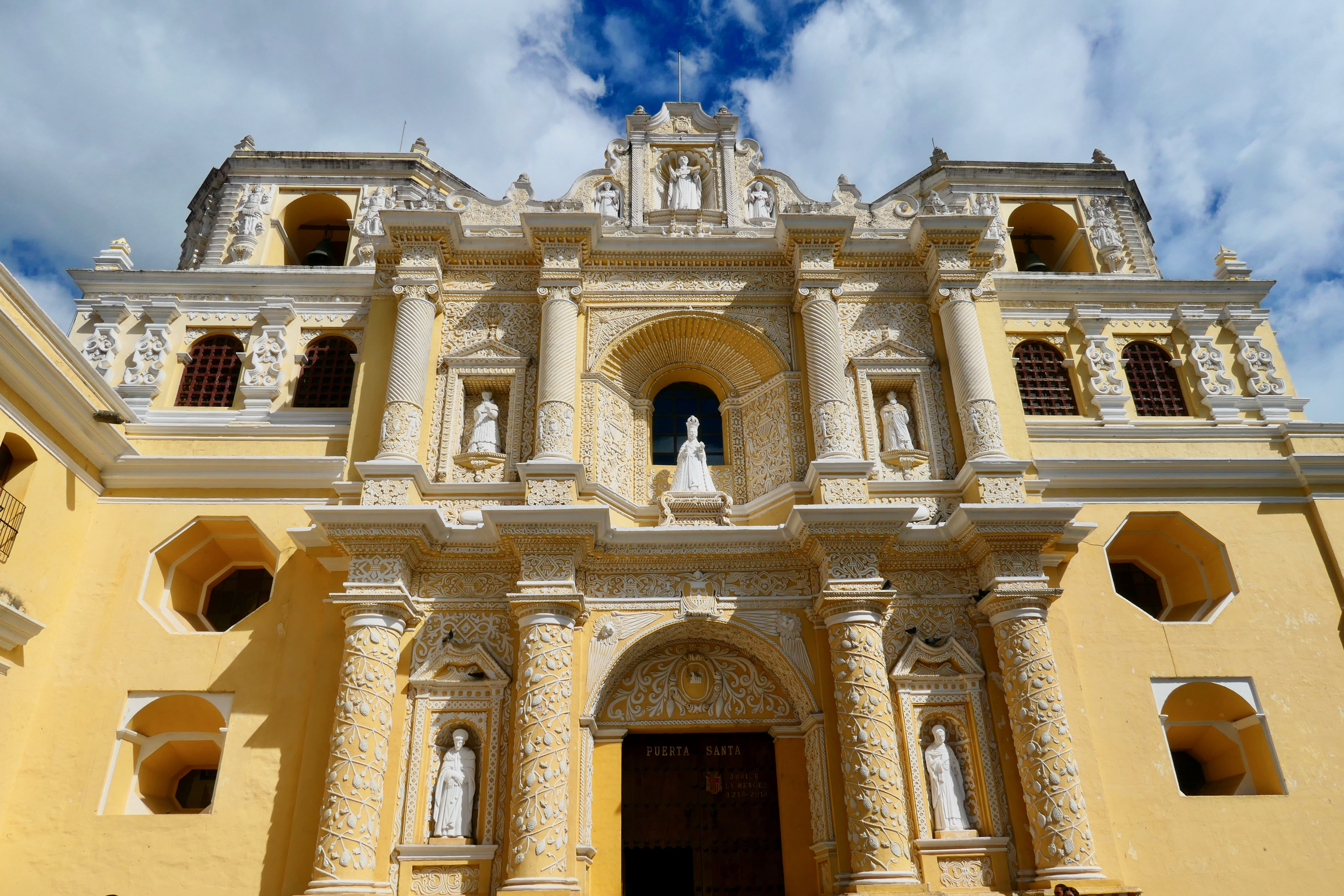
La merced Church, Santiago de los Caballeros, Guatemala

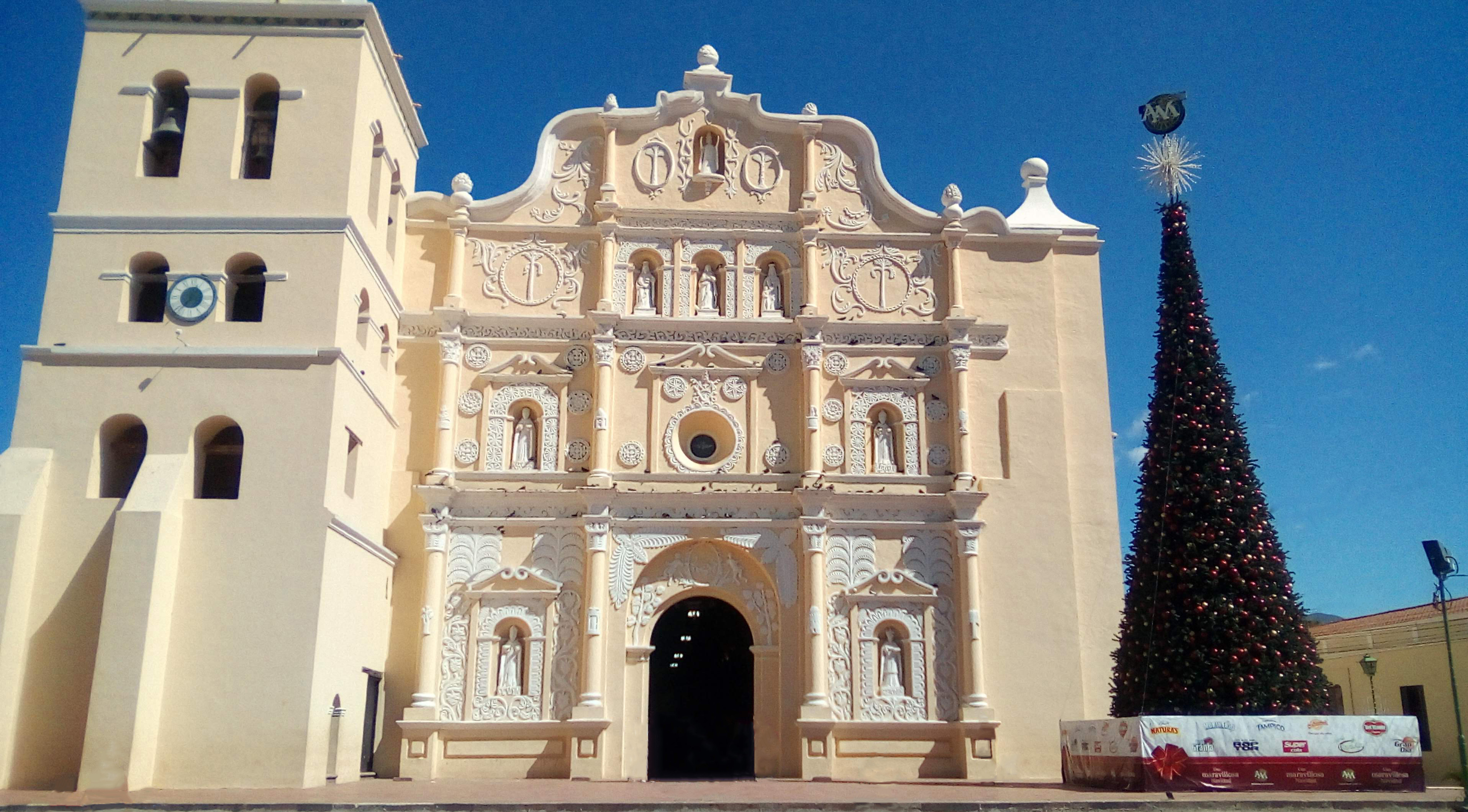
Innmaculate conception cathedral, Comayagua, Honduras

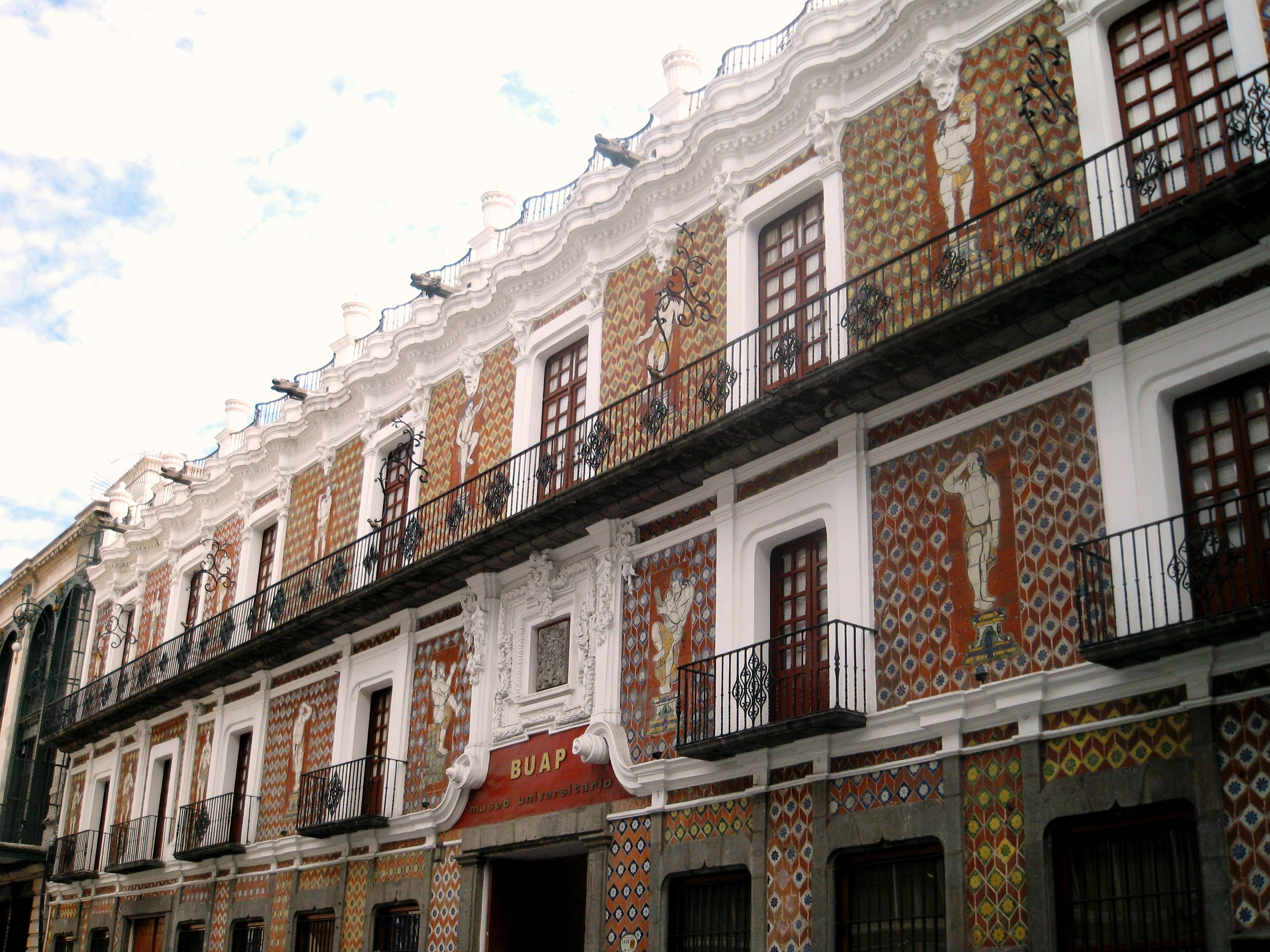
The Baroque Casa de los Muñecos in the Historic Centre of Puebla, with a facade incorporating a Talavera mosaic

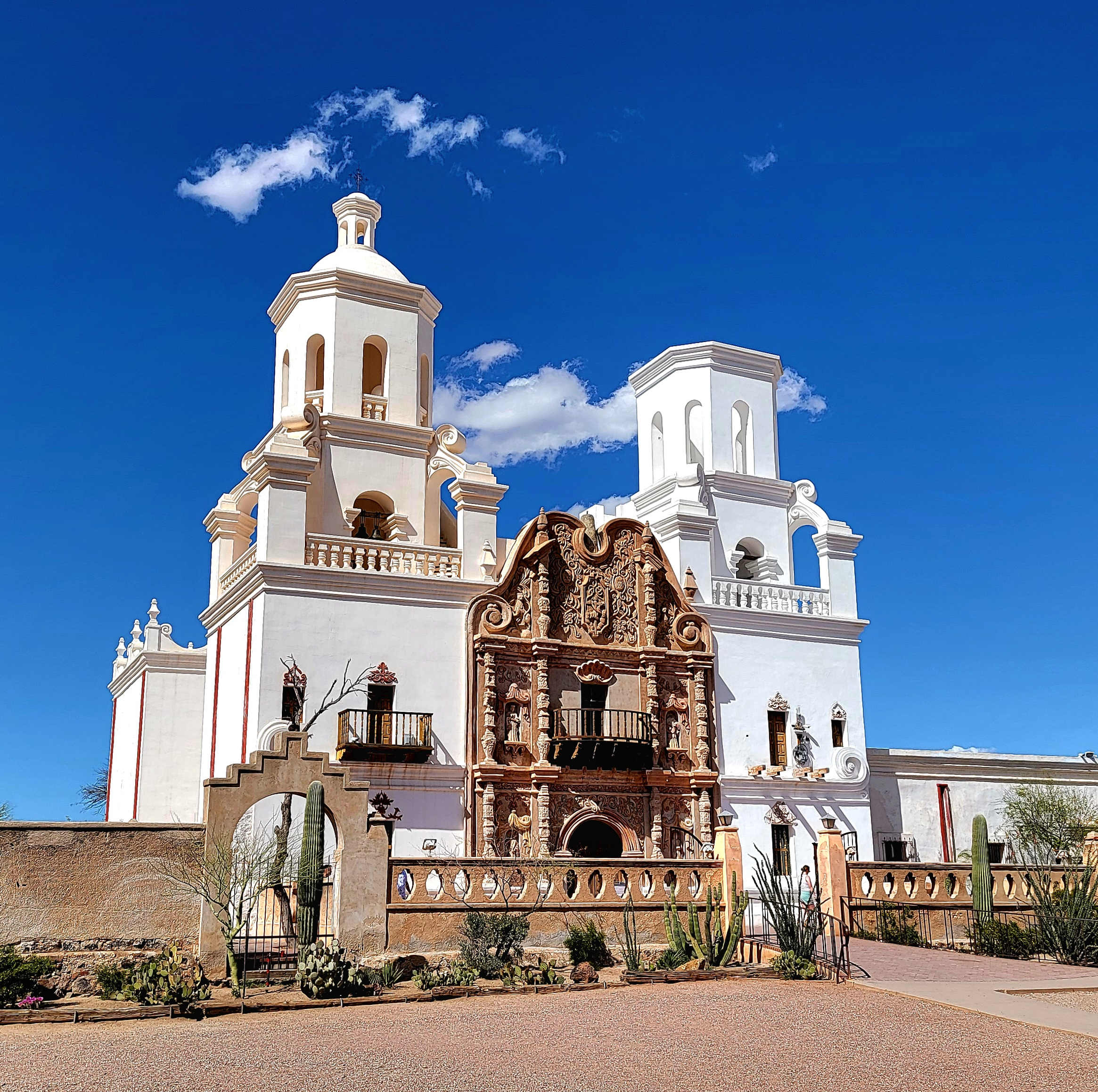
Misión de San Xavier de Bac, Arizona, United States

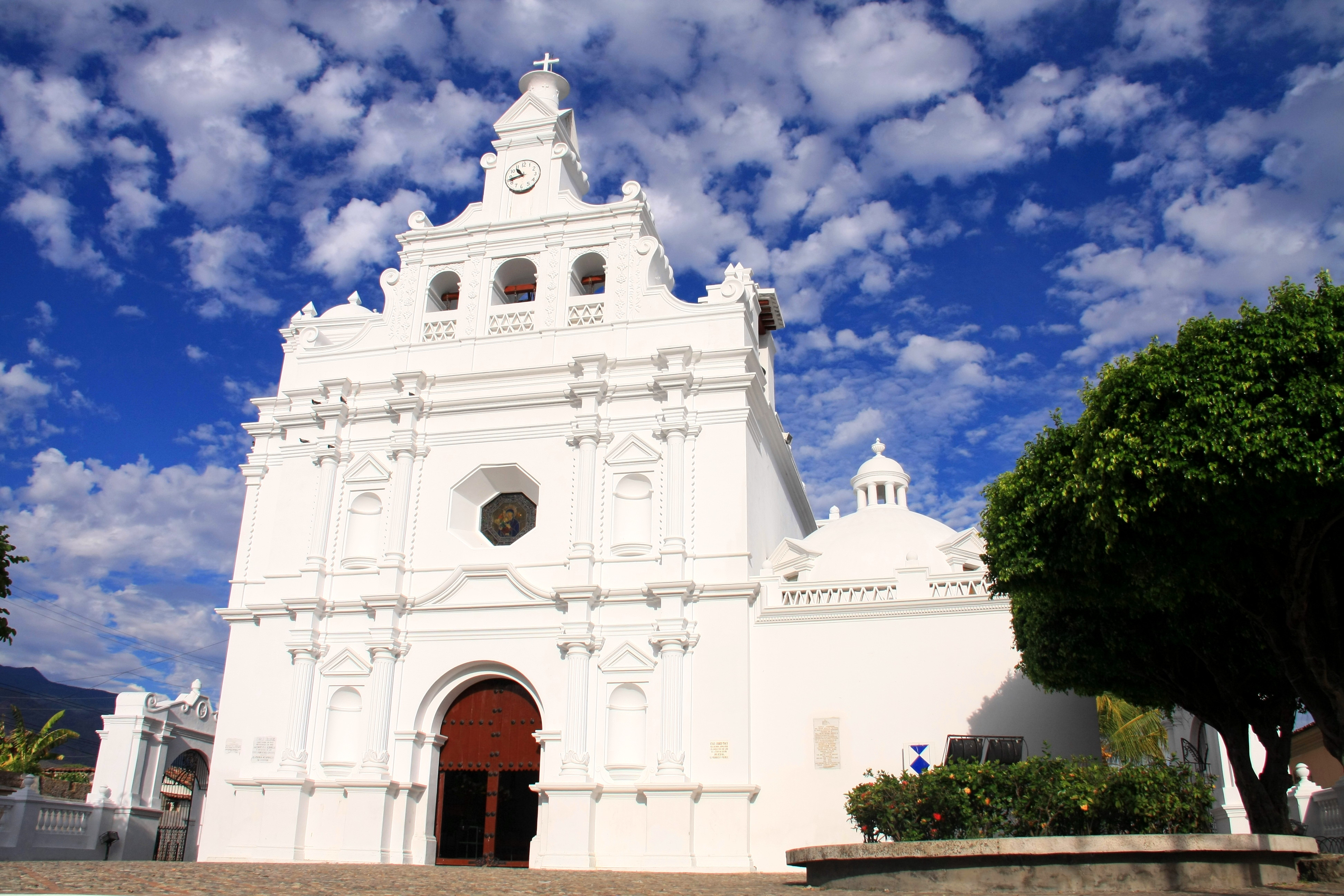
Church of Metapán, Metapán, El salvador

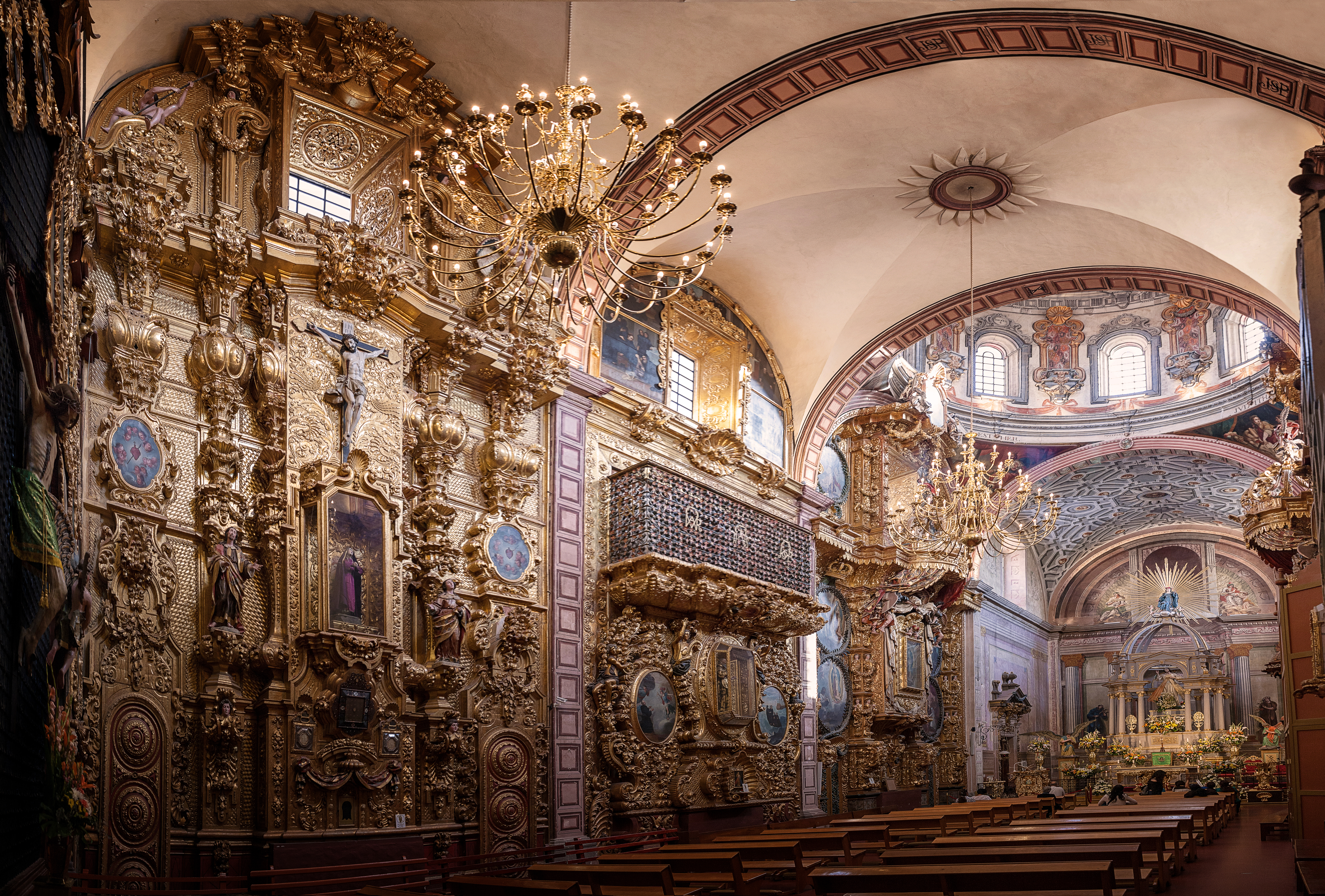
Interior of the St. Rose of Viterbo Church, Querétaro, showing the late Mexican Baroque reminiscent of Rococo

== See also ==
- Baroque art in Mexico
- Azulejo
