= List of public art in Puebla (city) =

List of public artworks in Puebla, Mexico

There are many public artworks displayed in Puebla, in the Mexican state of Puebla.

== Outdoor sculptures ==
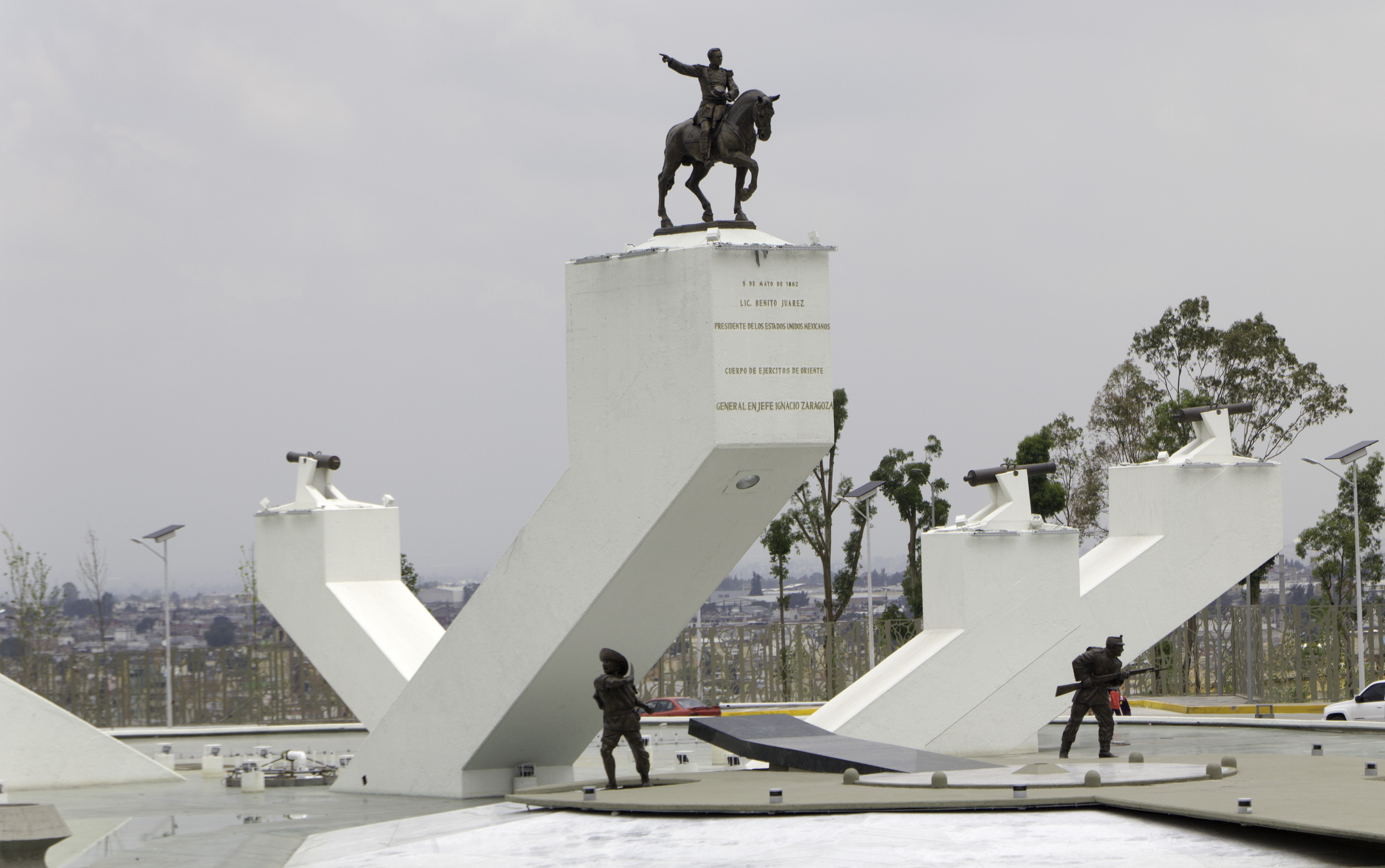
Monument to Ignacio Zaragoza, 2012

- Ángel Custodio
- Ángeles testigos de la Beatificación de Juan de Palafox y Mendoza
- Bust of Plácido Domingo
- Kiosko (Hendrix)
- Maqueta del Centro de Puebla
- Monumento a la Victoria del 5 de Mayo
- Monumento a los Fundadores de Puebla
- Monumento al Sitio de Puebla
- Monument to Ignacio Zaragoza
- Puebla de los Ángeles
- San Miguel Arcángel Fountain
- Statue of Álex Lora
- Statue of Esteban de Antuñano
- Statue of Héctor Azar
- Statue of Sebastian de Aparicio
