= El Parián (Puebla) =

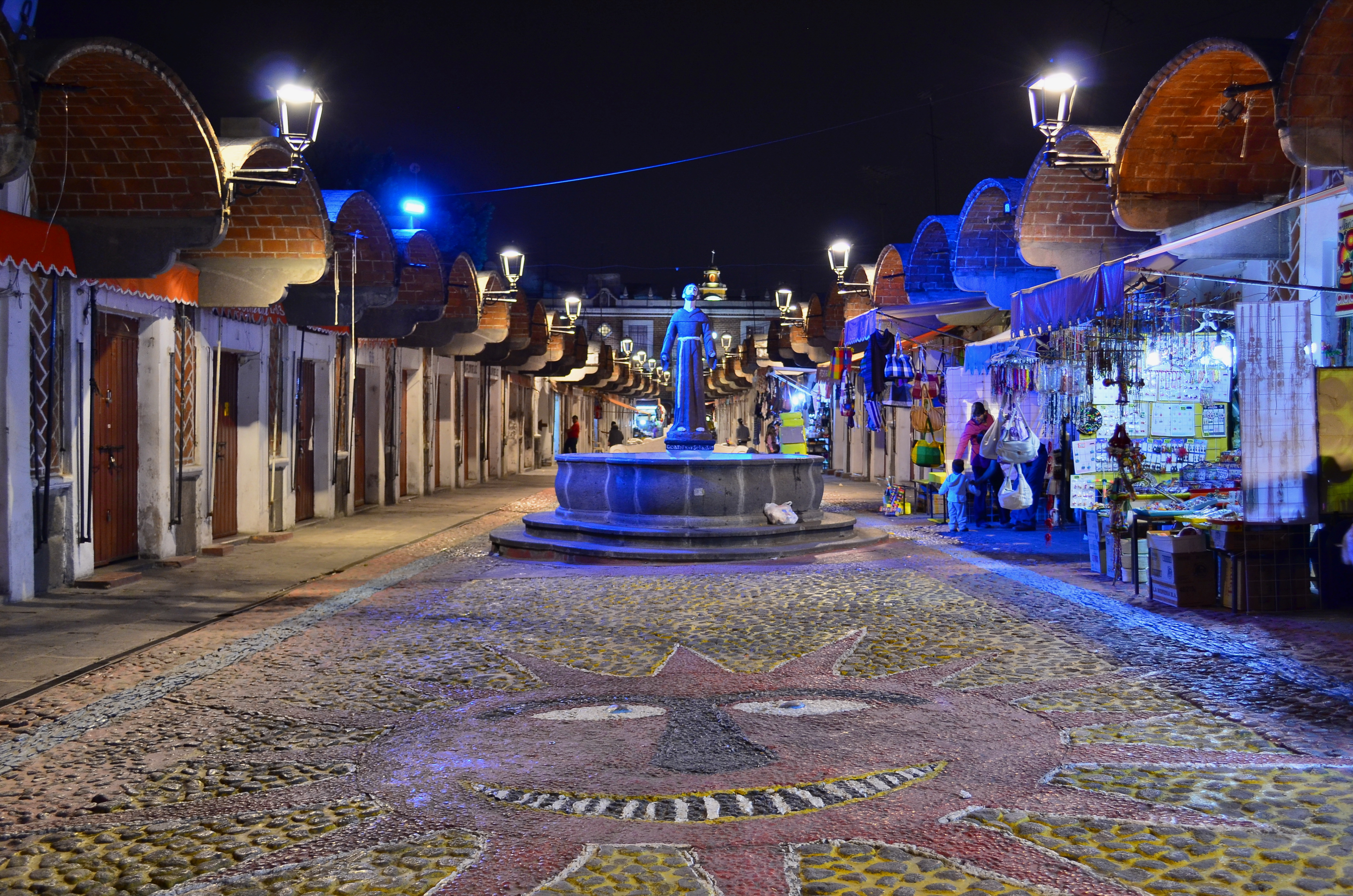
- Location: Puebla (city)
- Coordinates: 19°2′37.21″N 98°11′36.42″W
- Opened: 1760, 1961
- Num. of stores: 112

El Parián is Puebla’s largest and only traditional handcraft market. It is one of the most-visited tourist attractions of the city.

== Location ==
Located on the southeastern corner of Puebla’s historic center, is surrounded by Barrio del Artista (Neighborhood of the Artist). The streets outside the market proper is filled with galleries and artists selling on the street.

Most of its buildings are made of brick with Talavera tile accents very typical of Puebla traditional architecture, and its streets are paved in stone. There are 112 stands, which sell handcrafts from various parts of Mexico. These include various kinds of pottery, regional and traditional clothing, leather goods, wood items, jewelry and copper work. Handcrafts from Puebla state dominate, including Talavera pottery, silver from Amozoc, amate paper from Pahuatlán and traditional candies such as camotes.

== History ==
The buildings originally were always a market, called El Parian, which opened in 1760 and operated until the end of the 19th century. By 1801, it was a major stop and market for caravans bringing goods from Veracruz, Oaxaca, La Costa Chica of Guerrero and Mexico City. Its demise came with the construction of the railroads, devolving into a flea market and market for cheap goods. In 1961, the market was revamped to its current use, to move street vendors off the main plaza.

== See also ==
- Parián
- Zócalo
