= Parish of Santa Clara, Puebla =

Parish of Santa Clara
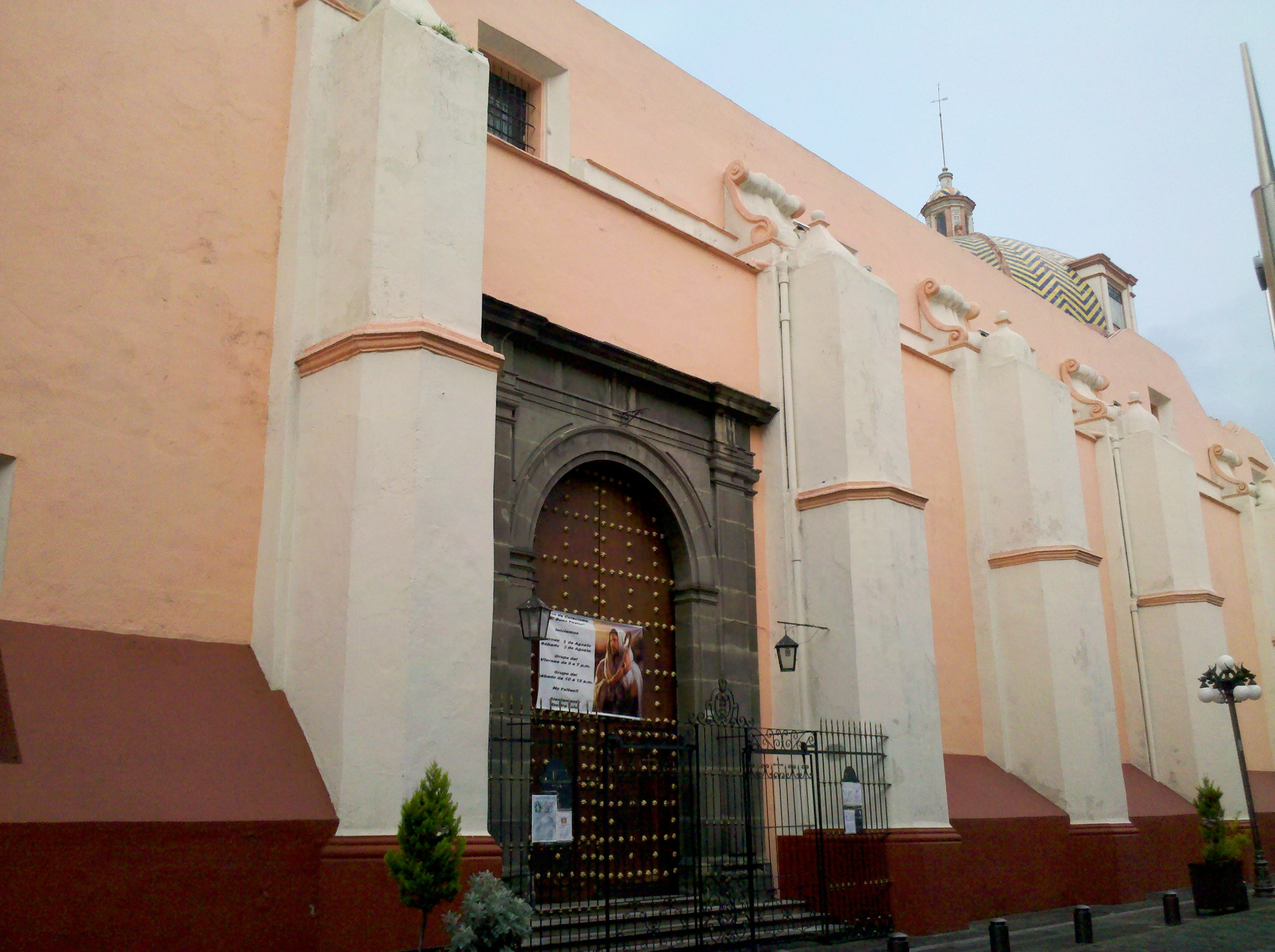
- Exterior in 2014
- Parish of Santa Clara
- 19°2′45″N 98°11′45″W
- Location: Puebla
- Country: Mexico

The Parish of Santa Clara is a church in the city of Puebla's historic centre, in the Mexican state of Puebla.

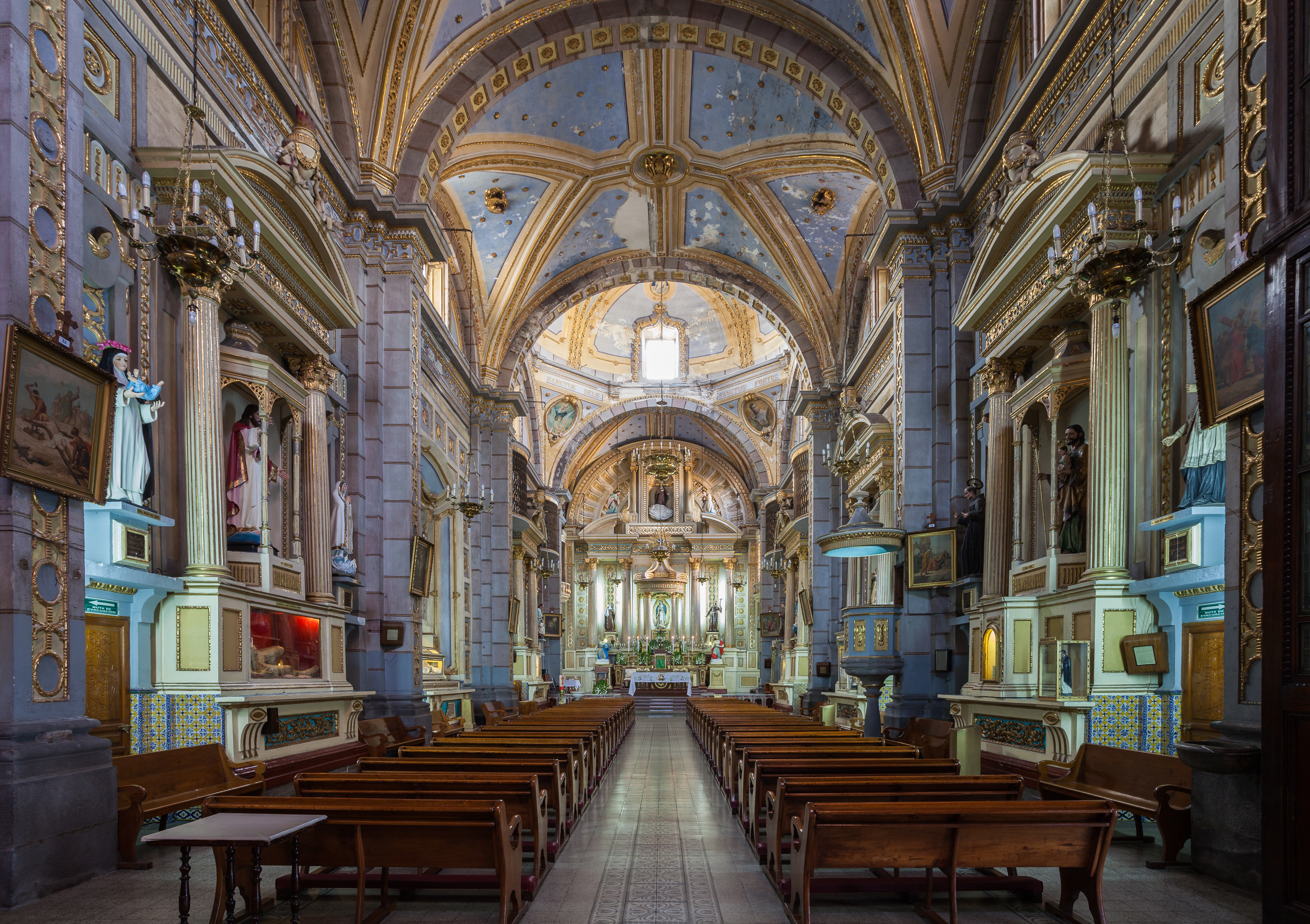
The church's interior in 2013
