= Church of San Pedro, Puebla =

Church in Puebla, Mexico

Church of San Pedro
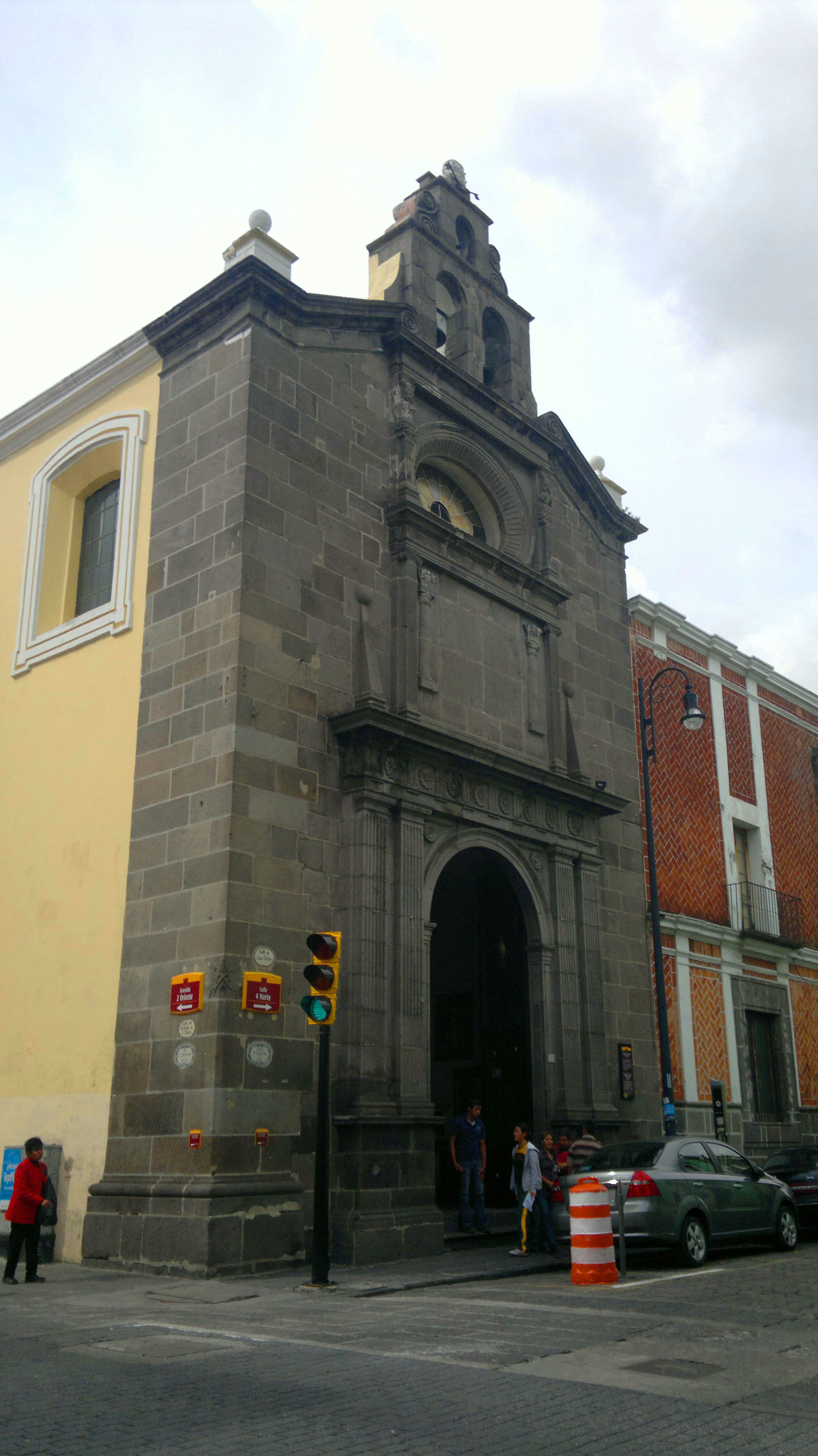
- Exterior, 2012

- Location within Mexico

Location
- Country: Mexico
- Interactive map of Church of San Pedro
- Coordinates: 19°2′37.9″N 98°11′43.2″W

Iglesia de San Pedro is a church in the city of Puebla's historic centre, in the Mexican state of Puebla.

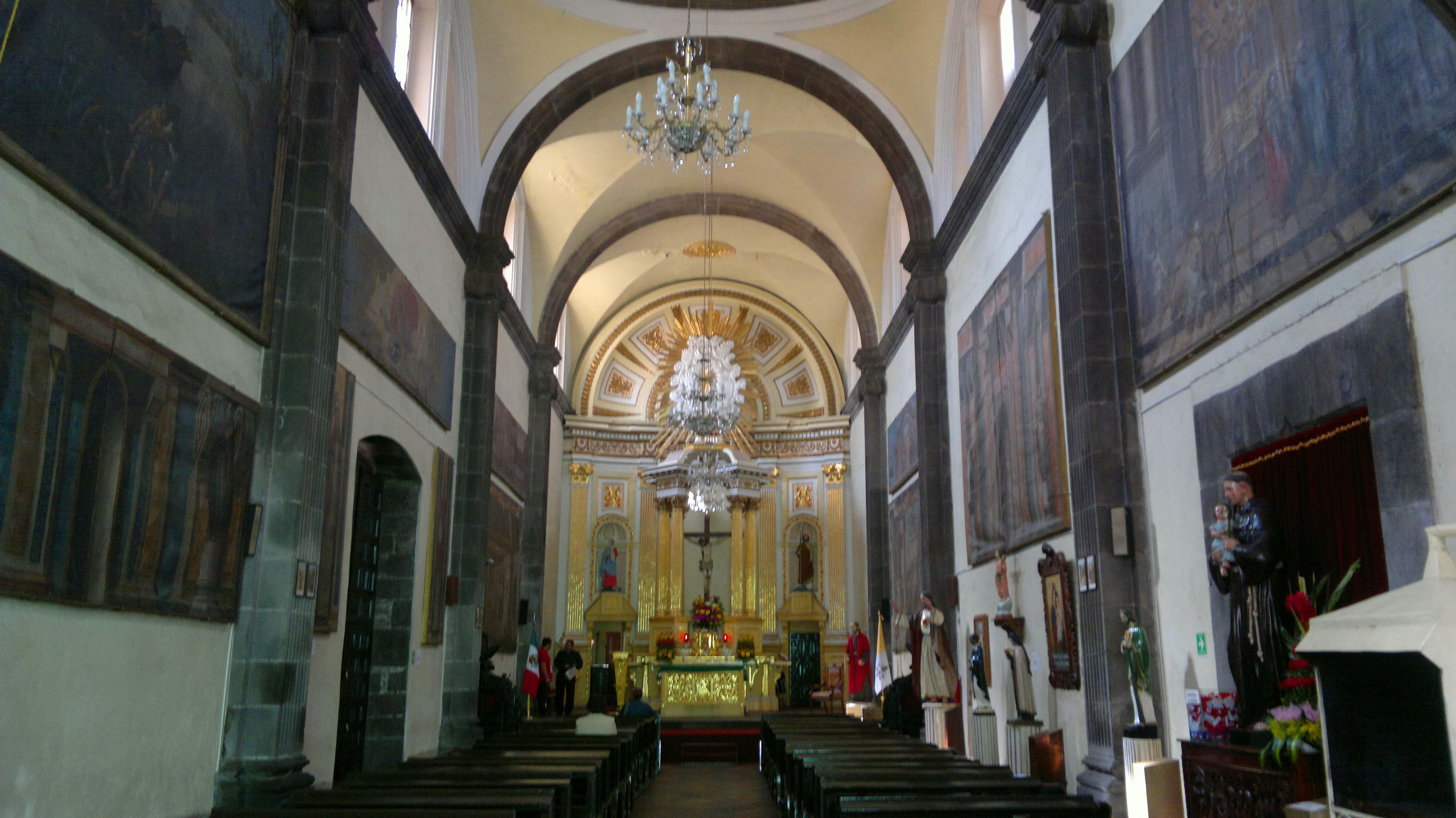
The church's interior in 2012
