= Municipal Hall of Puebla =

Building in Puebla, Mexico

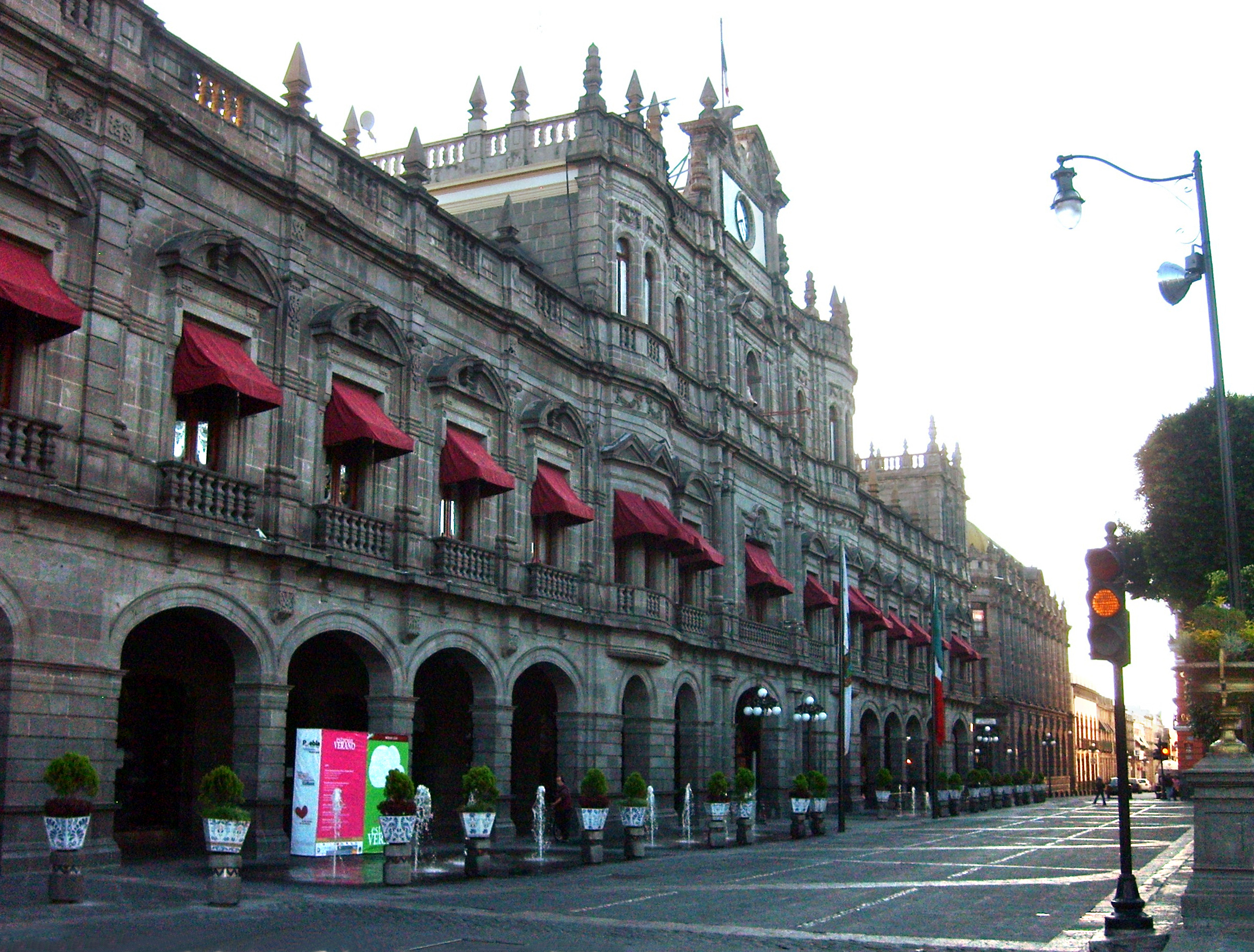
- Interactive map of the Municipal Hall of Puebla area

General information
- Location: Puebla, Puebla, Mexico
- Coordinates: 19°2′38″N 98°11′51″W

Design and construction
- Architect: Charles T. S. Hall

The Municipal Hall of Puebla is a building in Puebla's historic centre, in the Mexican state of Puebla.
