= Convent Church of San Joaquín y Santa Ana, Puebla =

Church of las Capuchinas
- Iglesia de las Capuchinas
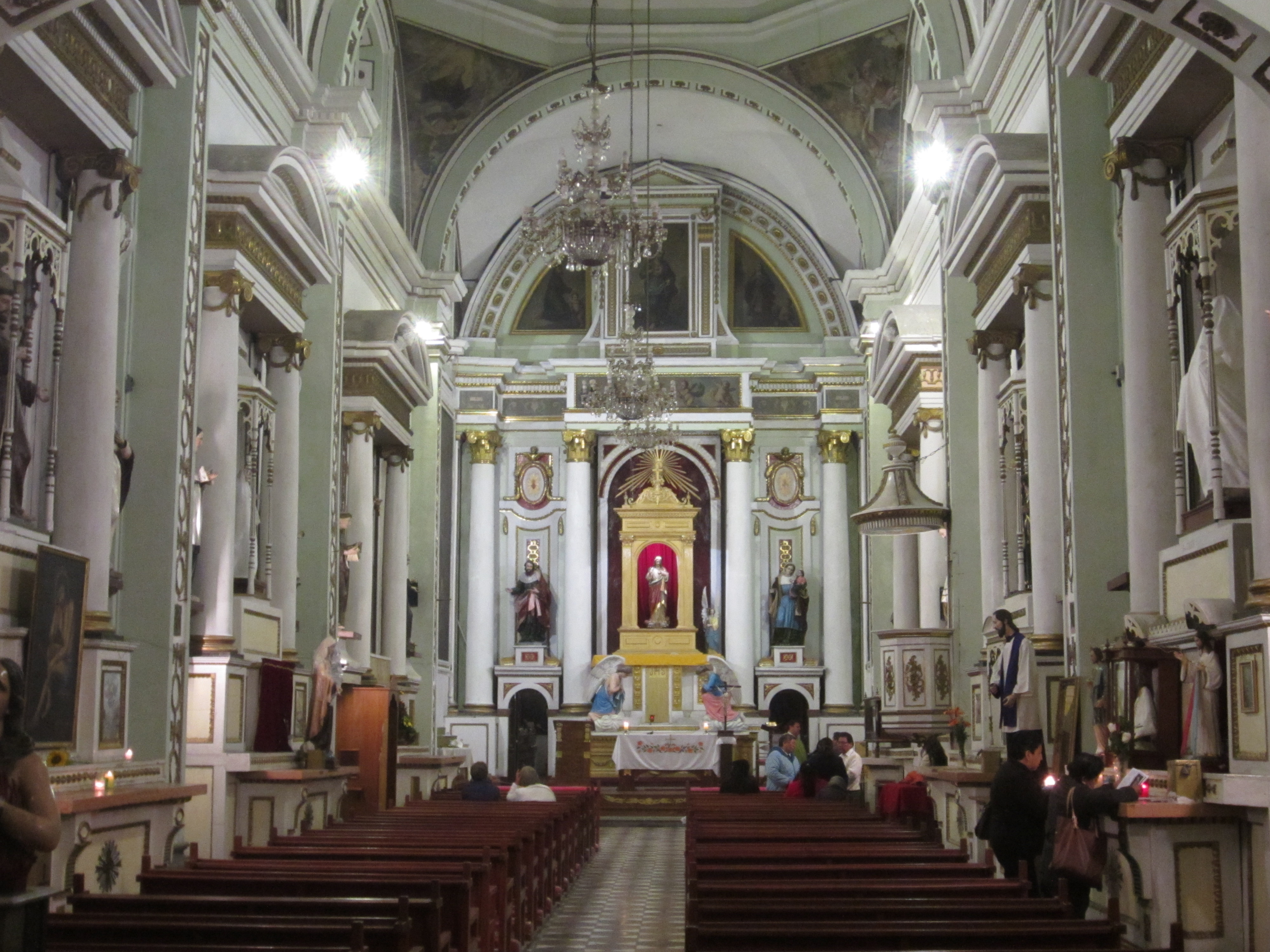
- The church's interior in 2018
- Church of las Capuchinas
- 19°2′28″N 98°12′0″W
- Location: Puebla
- Country: Mexico

Iglesia de las Capuchinas, also known as Iglesia de San Joaquín y Santa Ana, is a church in the city of Puebla's historic centre, in the Mexican state of Puebla.
