= Barrio de los Sapos =

Tourist attraction in Puebla, Mexico

Coordinates: 19°2′27″N 98°11′47″W

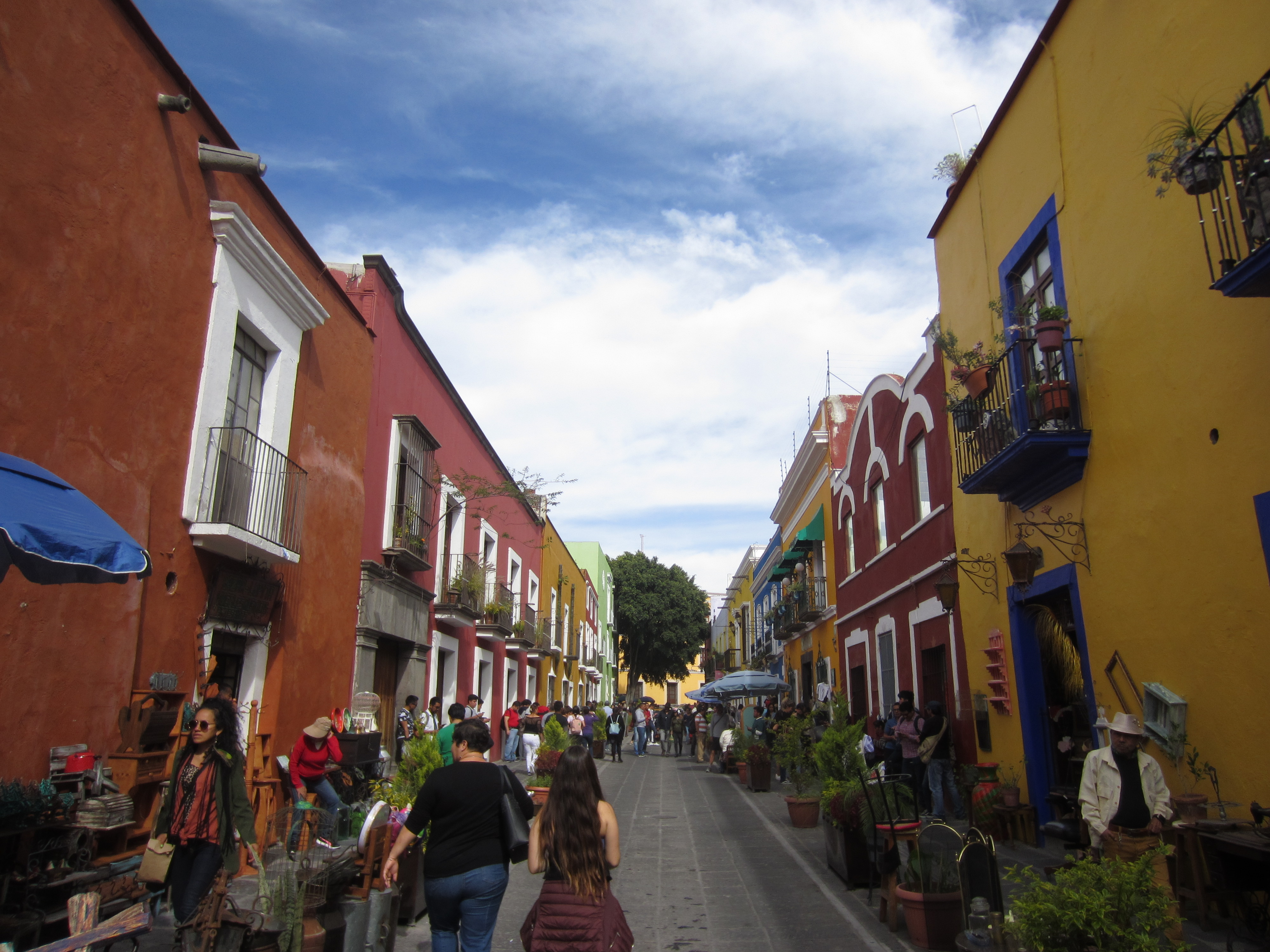
Storefronts in 2018

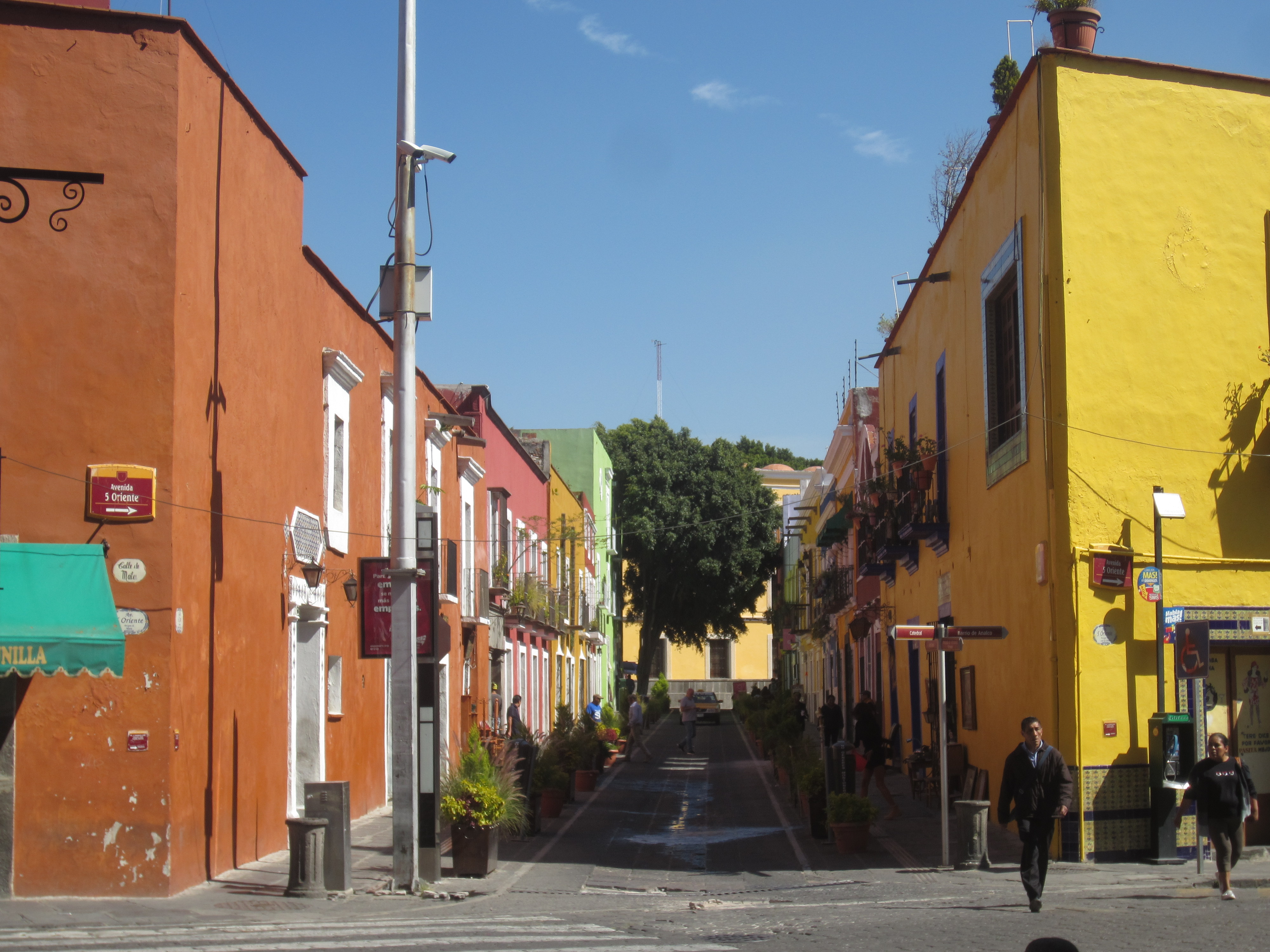
Street in 2018

Barrio de los Sapos, or Callejón de los Sapos (English: "alley of the frogs"), is a tourist attraction in the city of Puebla's historic center, in Puebla, Mexico.
