= Hospital Church of San Roque =

Church in Puebla, Mexico

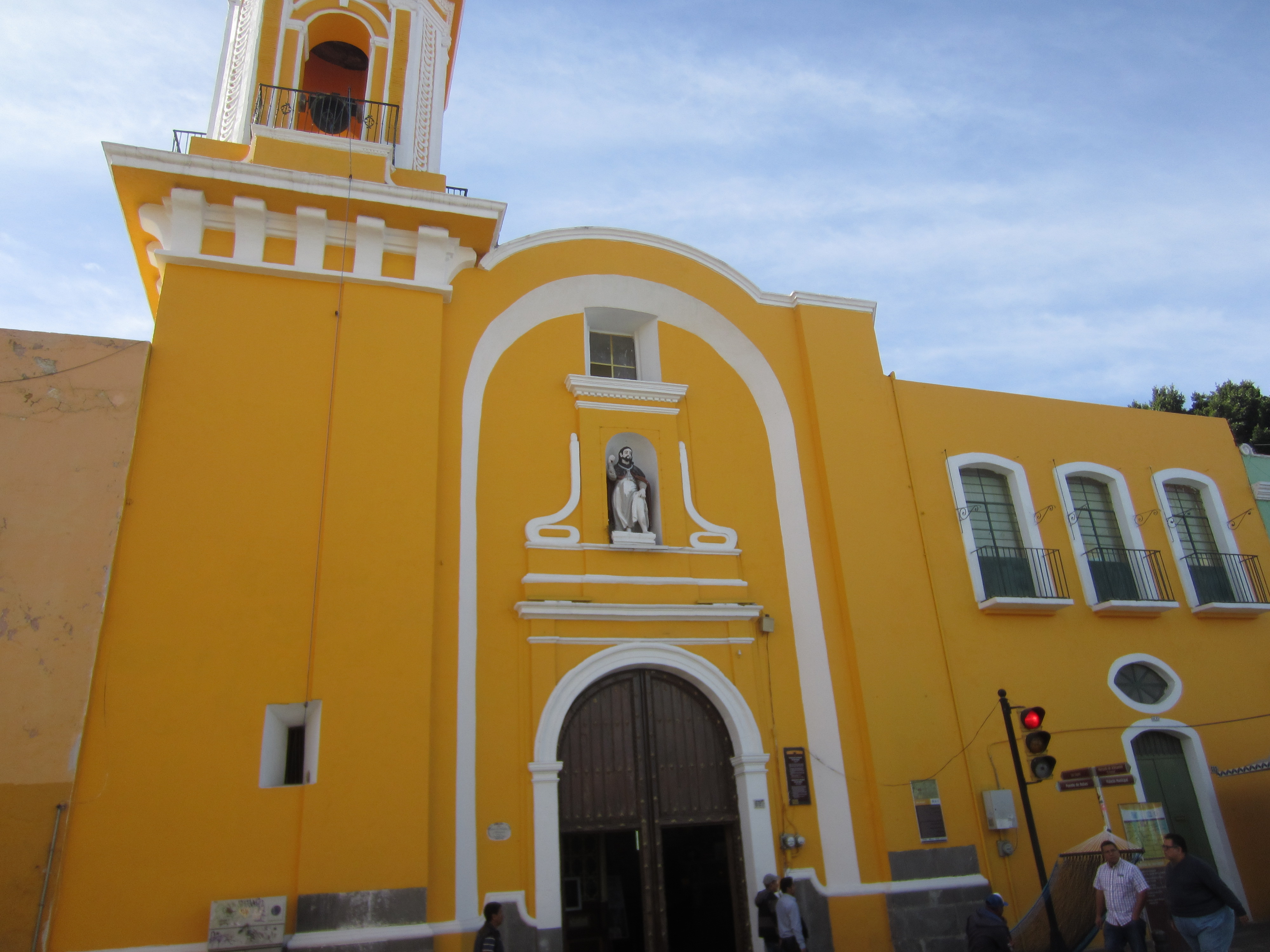
- The church's exterior in 2018

- Location within Mexico

Location
- Interactive map of Hospital Church of San Roque
- Coordinates: 19°2′31″N 98°11′39.5″W

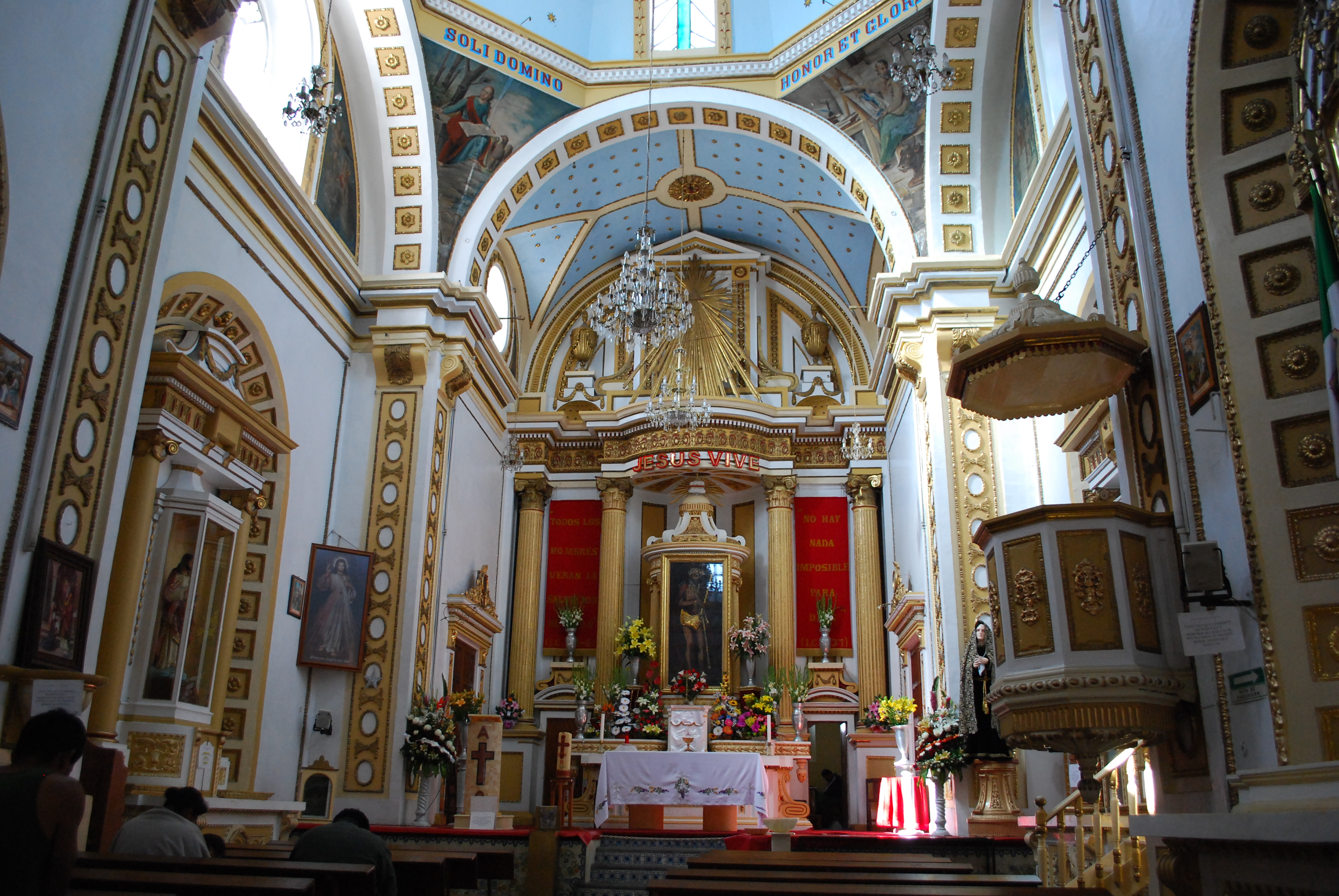
The church's interior, 2010

The Hospital Church of San Roque is a church in the city of Puebla's historic centre, in the Mexican state of Puebla.
