= Historic centre of Puebla =

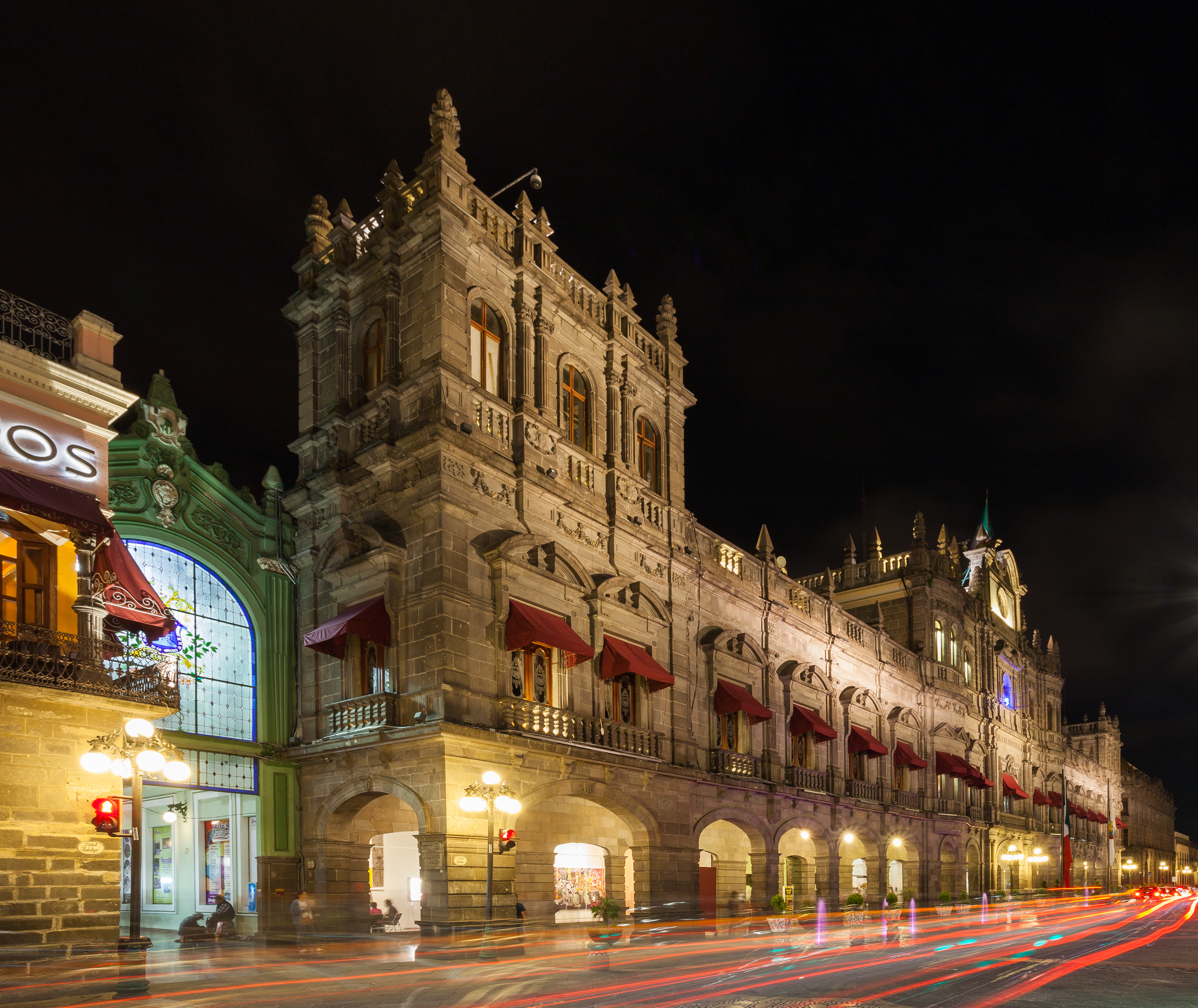
Municipal Hall of Puebla

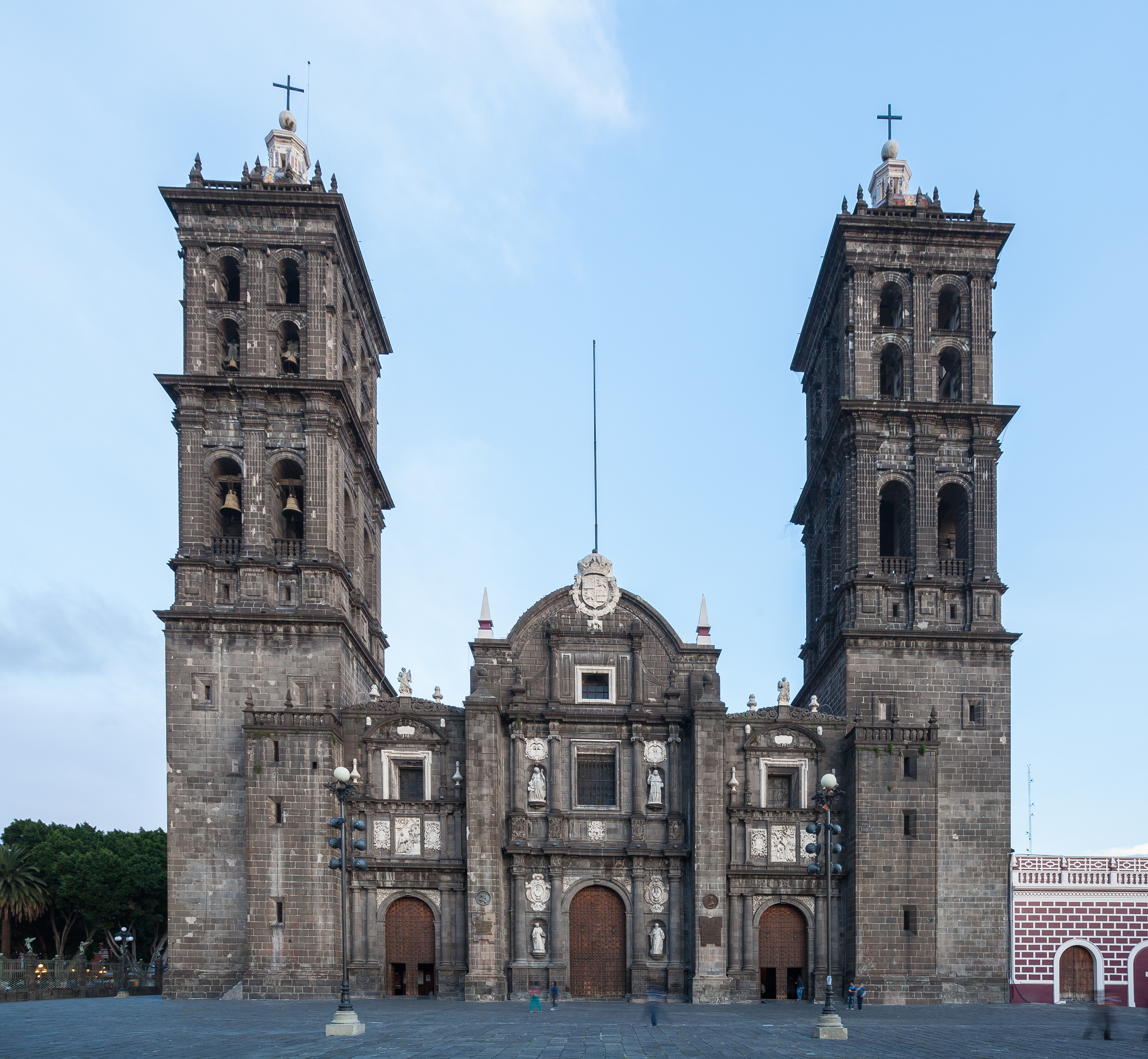
Puebla Cathedral

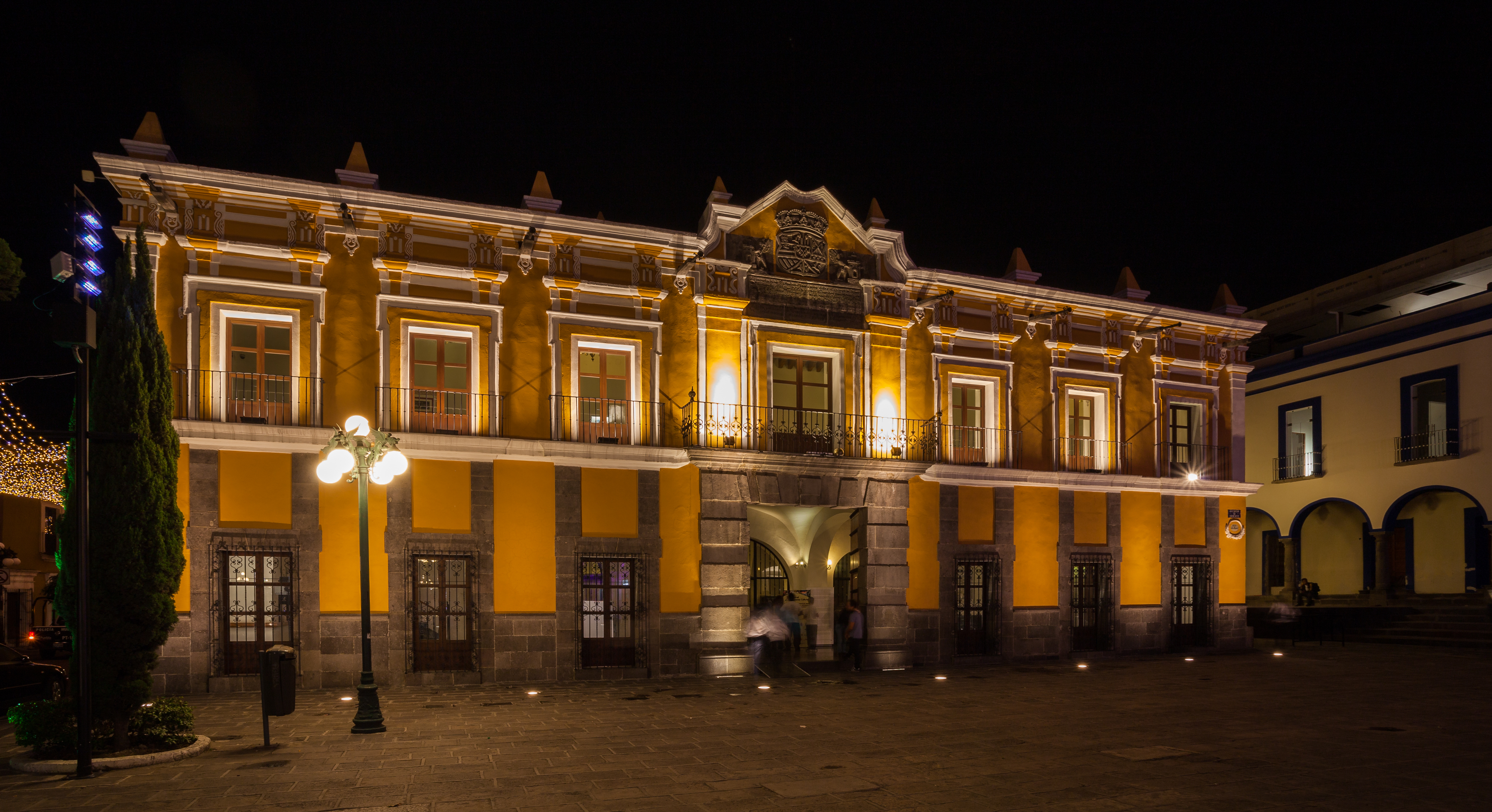
Teatro Principal de Puebla

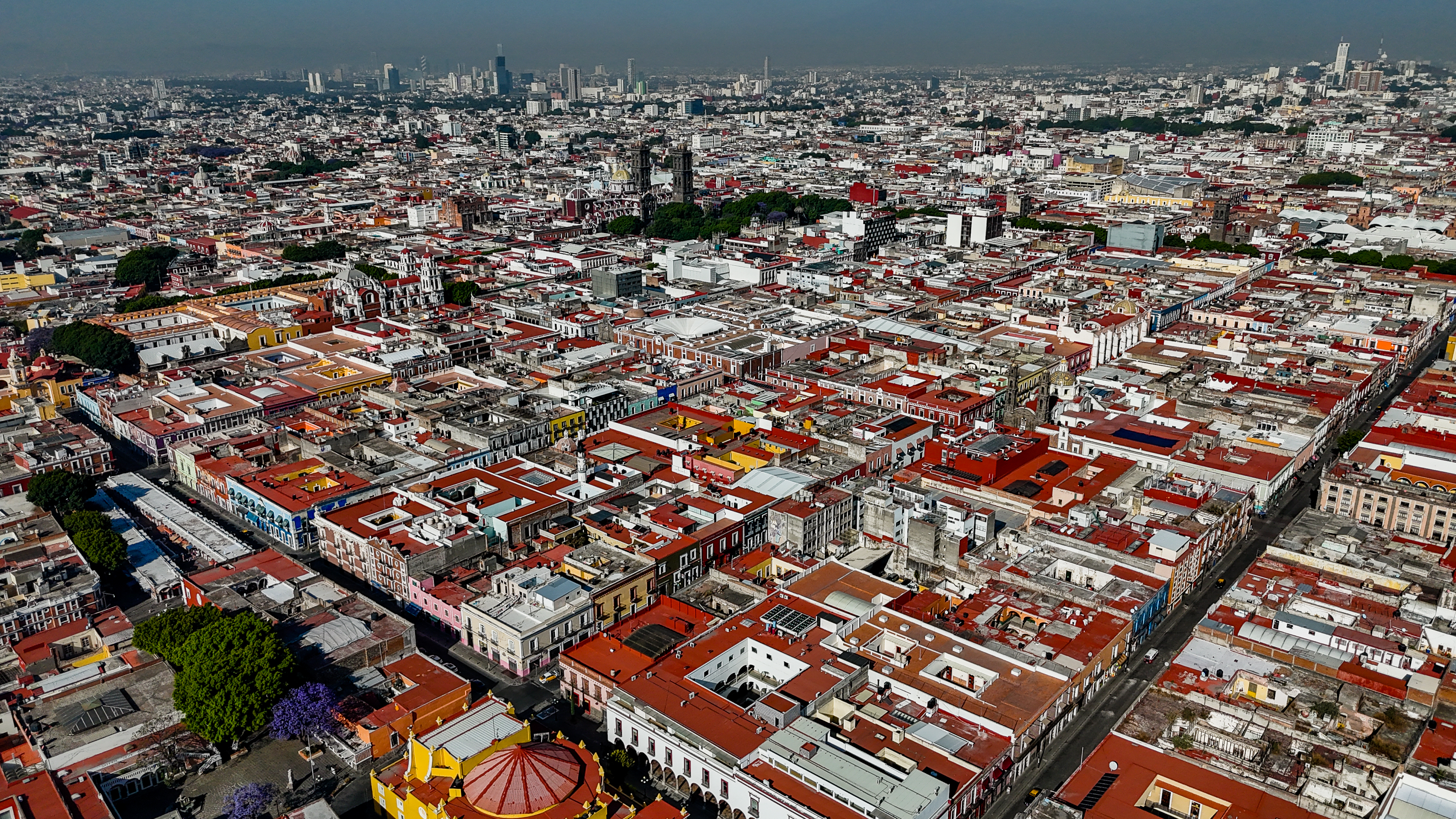
Aerial view obtained with drone of the Historic Center of the City of Puebla, Puebla, Mexico.

The historic centre of Puebla (Spanish: centro histórico de Puebla) was declared a World Heritage Site by UNESCO in 1987.

The Historic Monuments Zone of Puebla is considered the origin of Puebla. This Zone was decreed a Historic Monuments Zone in 1977 by presidential decree and 1 year later UNESCO declared it a World Heritage Site. The Historic Monuments Zone retains a lot of colonial buildings. Several of the oldest buildings were badly damaged in 1999 after the earthquake and later were subsequently repaired. After the 2017 earthquake, some of them again suffered damage.

== Features ==
- Barrio de los Sapos
- Barrio del Artista
- Biblioteca Palafoxiana
- Casa de la Cultura
- Chapel of the Rosario
- Church of La Compañía
- Church of las Capuchinas
- Church of San Cristóbal
- Church of San Juan de Dios
- Church of San Pedro
- Church of Santo Domingo
- El Parián
- Hospital Church of San Roque
- Maqueta del Centro de Puebla
- Municipal Hall of Puebla
- Parish of Santa Clara
- Puebla Cathedral
  - Ángeles testigos de la Beatificación de Juan de Palafox y Mendoza
- Teatro Principal de Puebla
  - Bust of Plácido Domingo
  - Statue of Héctor Azar

== See also ==
- Historic center of Mexico City
- List of World Heritage Sites in Mexico
