= Maqueta del Centro de Puebla =

Sculpture in Puebla, Mexico

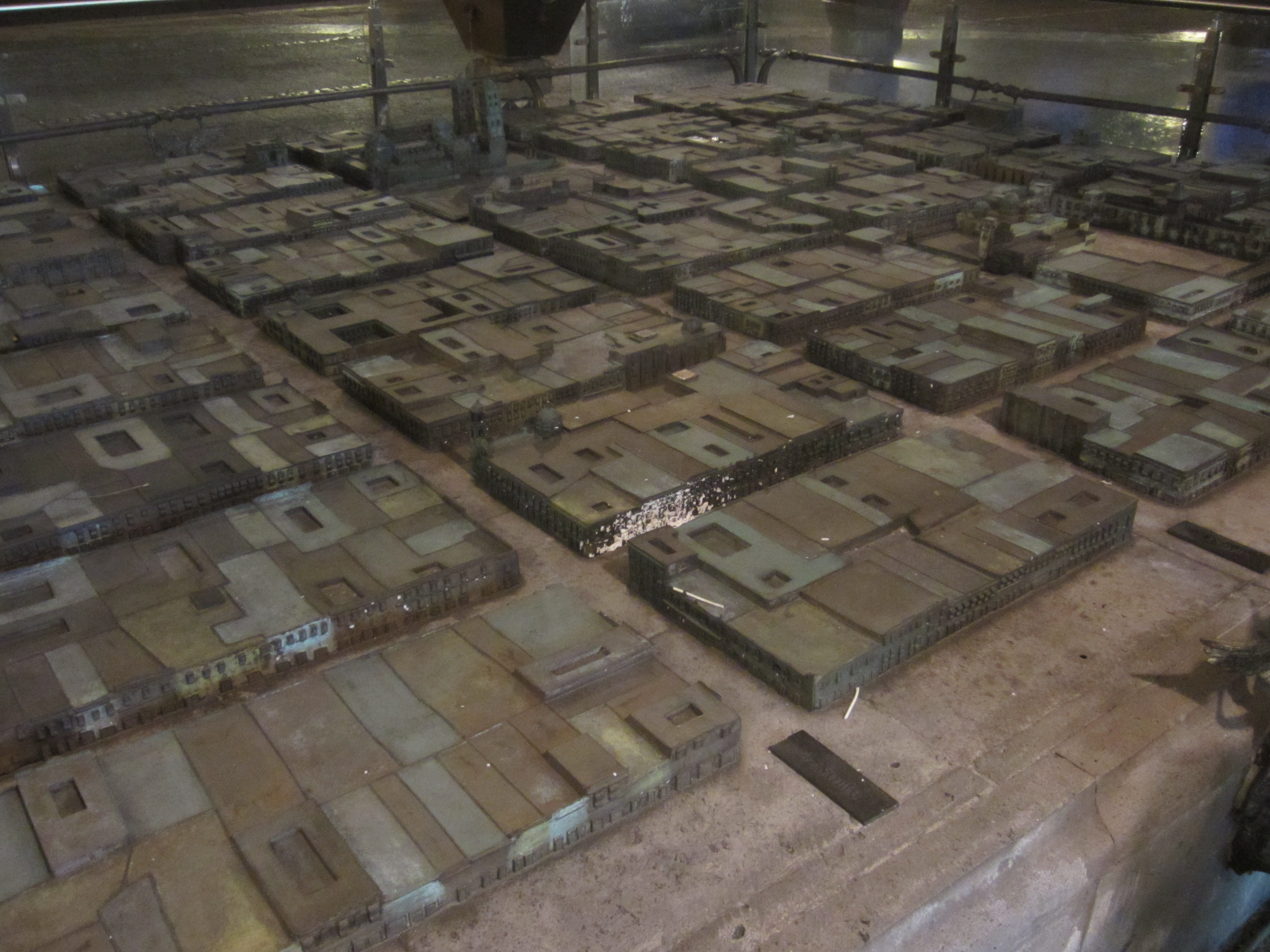
- The maquette in 2018
- Medium: Copper
- Subject: The city of Puebla's historic centre
- Location: Zócalo, Puebla
- 19°2′37.7″N 98°11′50.4″W

The Maqueta del Centro de Puebla is a copper maquette depicting the city of Puebla's historic centre, in Puebla, Mexico. The sculpture was installed near the Zócalo in 2008.

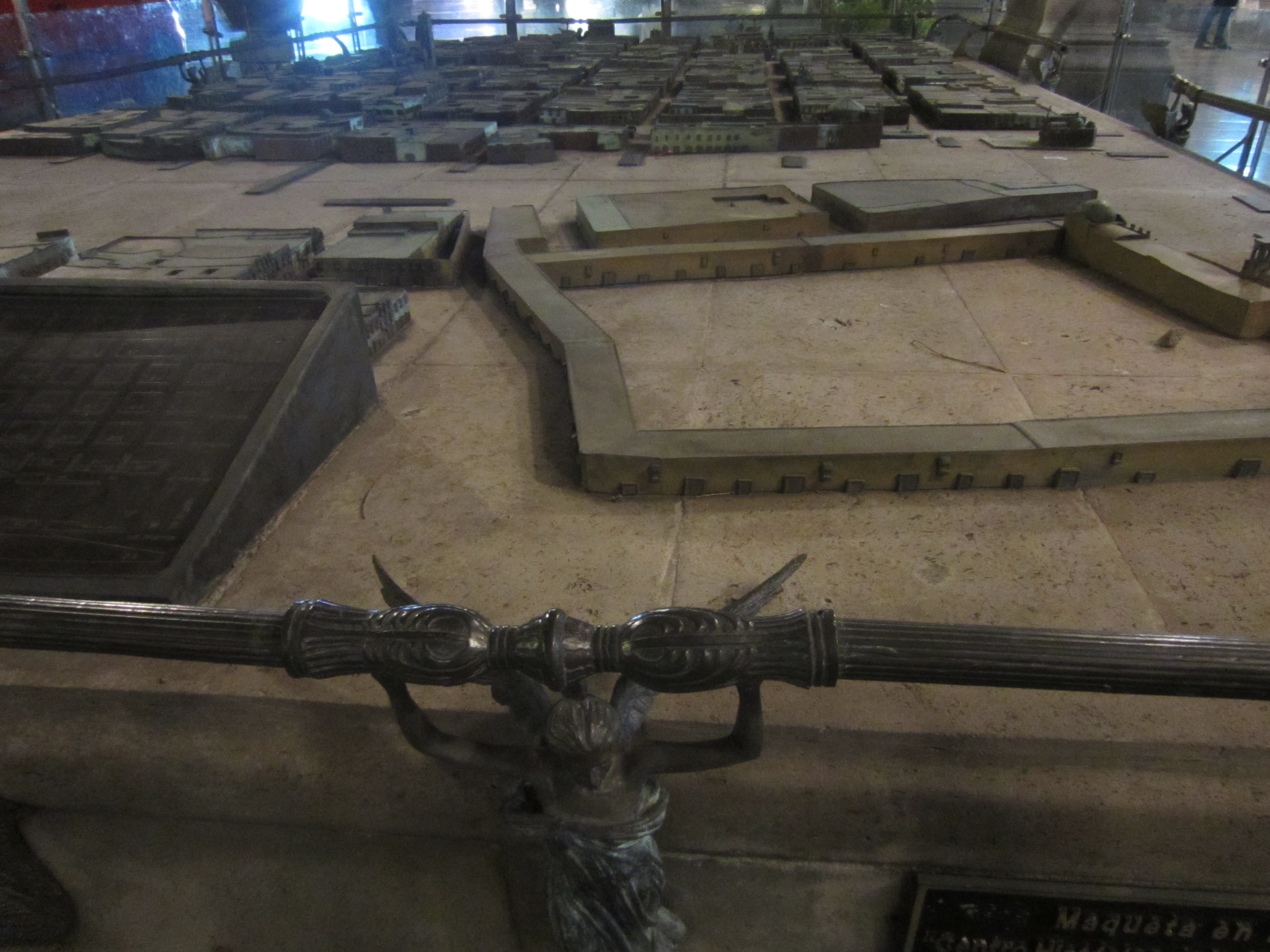

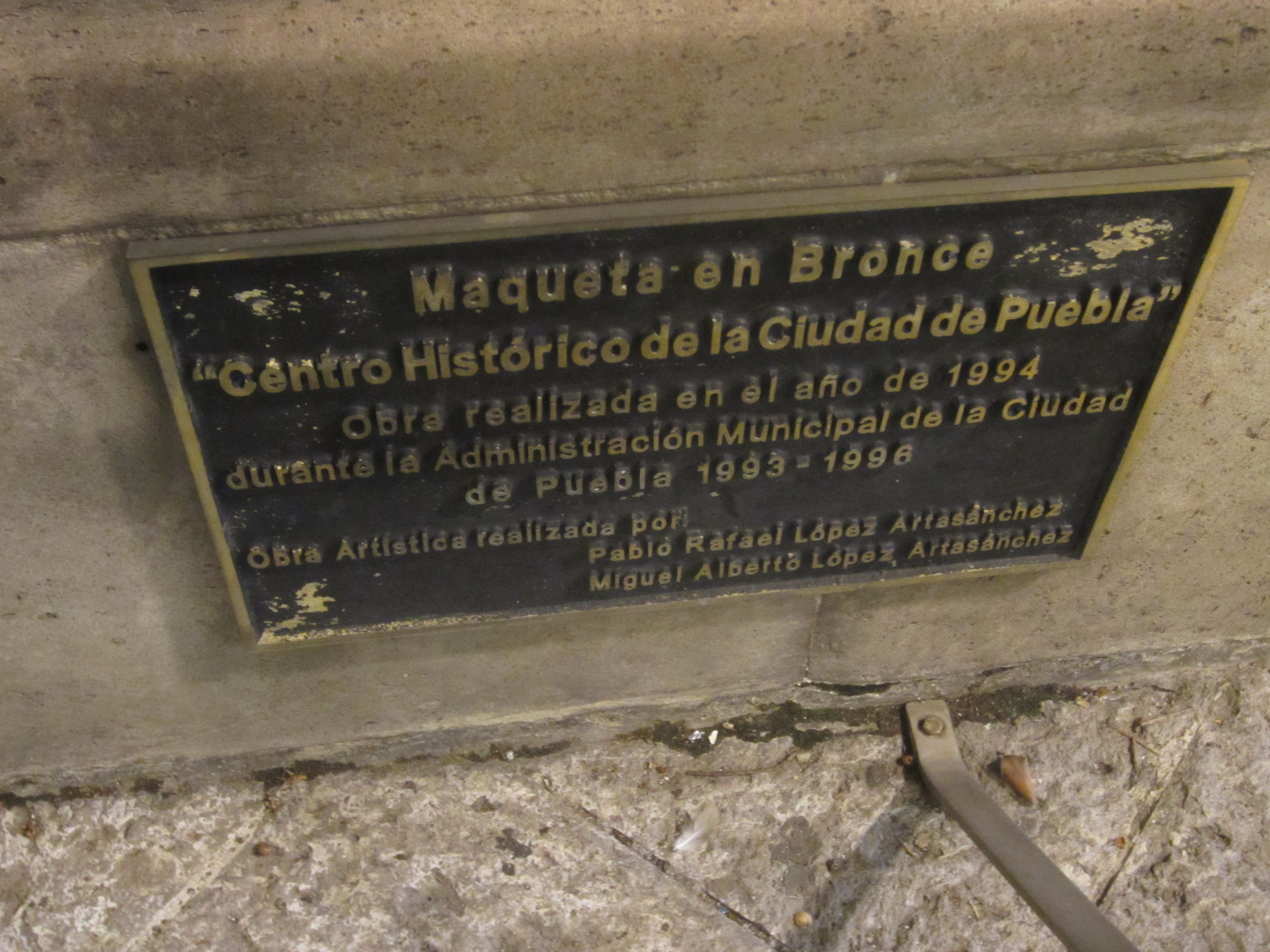
Plaque
