= Church of San Juan de Dios, Puebla =

Church in Puebla, Mexico

Church of San Juan de Dios
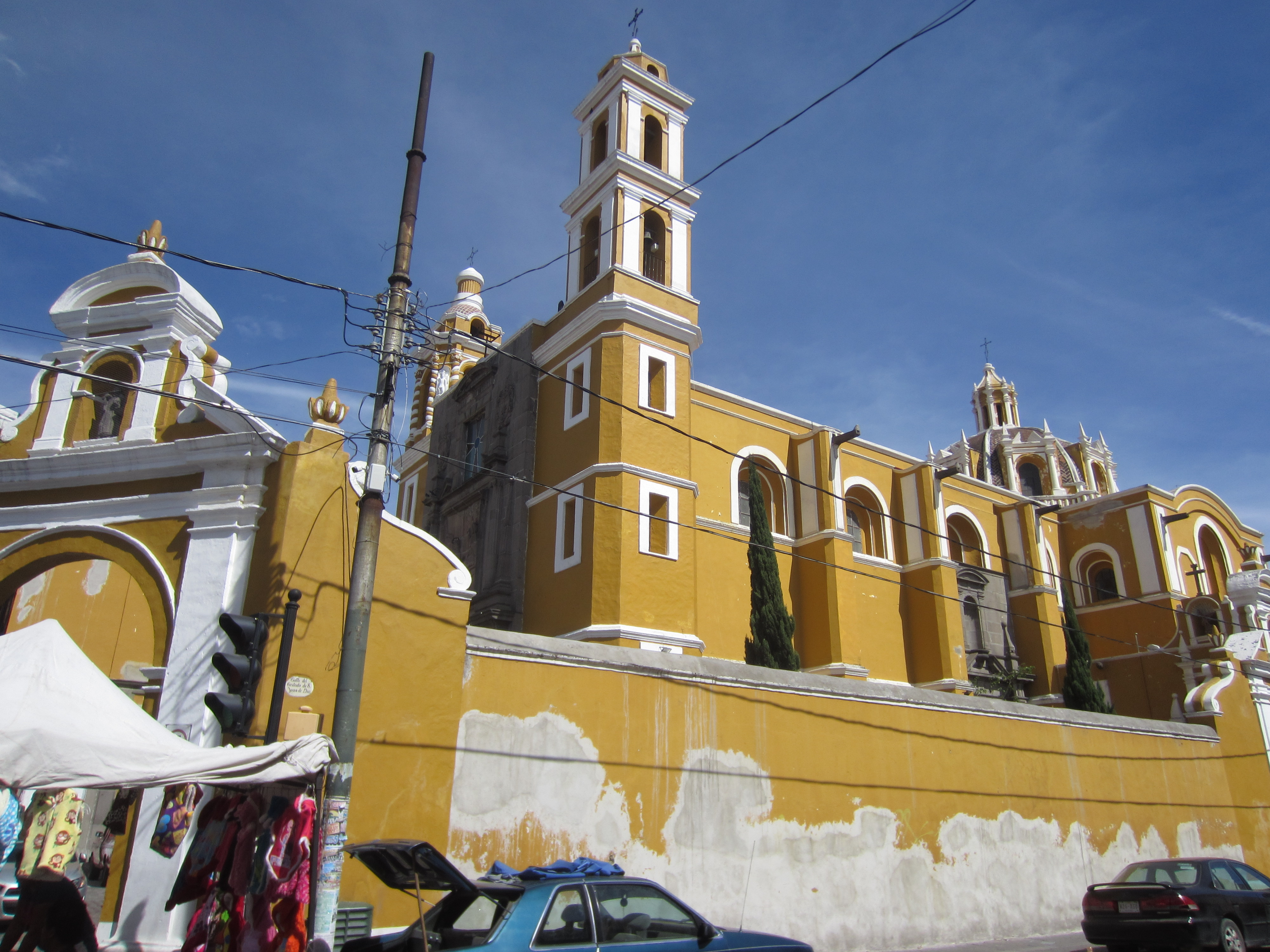
- The church's exterior in 2018

- Location within Mexico

Location
- Interactive map of Church of San Juan de Dios
- Coordinates: 19°3′2″N 98°11′41″W

Iglesia de San Juan de Dios is a church in the city of Puebla's historic center, in the Mexican state of Puebla.

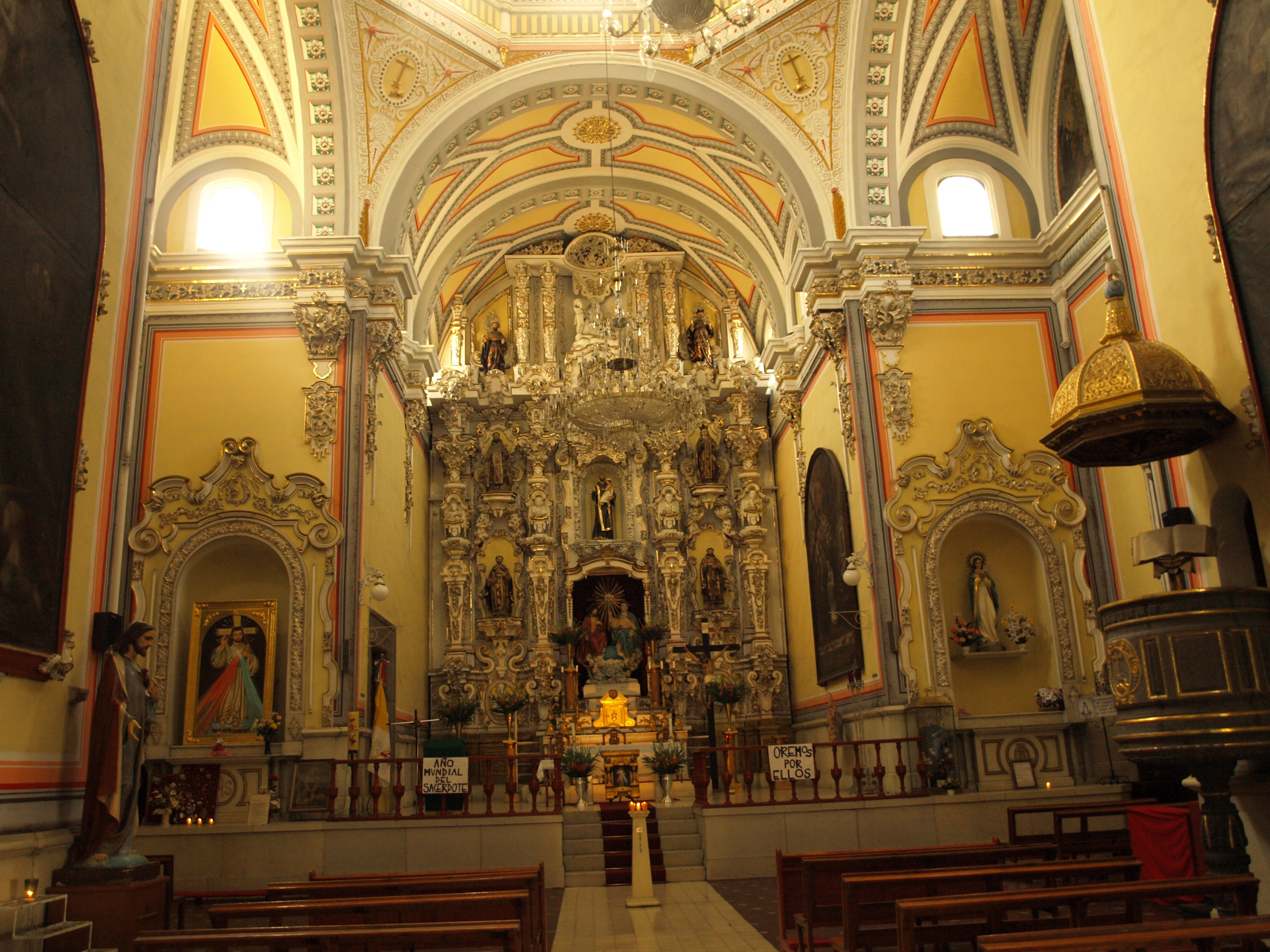
Interior, 2009
