= Church of San Cristóbal, Puebla =

Church in Puebla, Mexico

Church of San Cristóbal
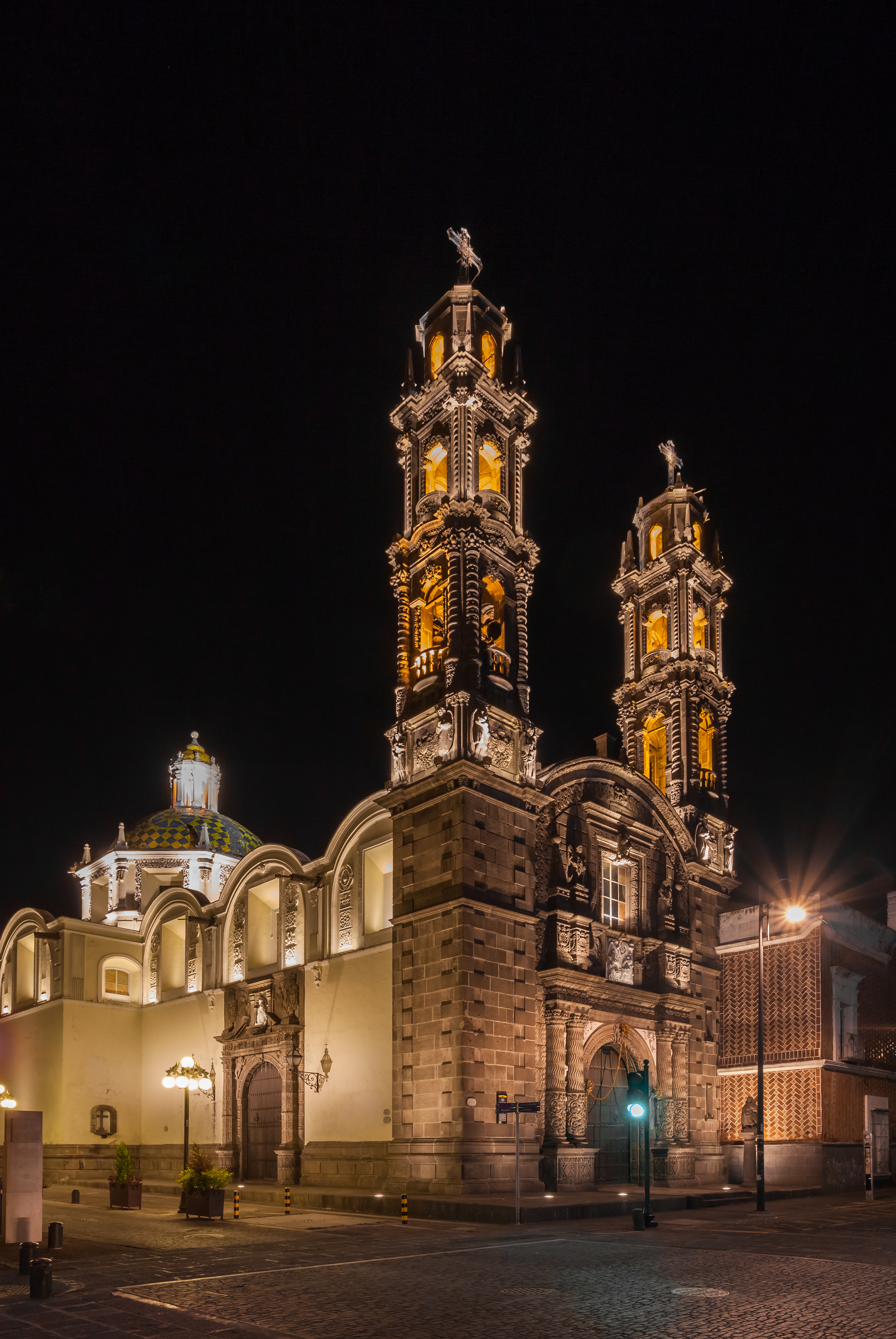
- The church's exterior in 2013

- Location within Mexico

Location
- Interactive map of Church of San Cristóbal
- Coordinates: 19°2′43.5″N 98°11′40″W

Church of San Cristóbal is a church in the city of Puebla's historic centre, in the Mexican state of Puebla.
