= Bust of Plácido Domingo =

Sculpture in Puebla, Mexico

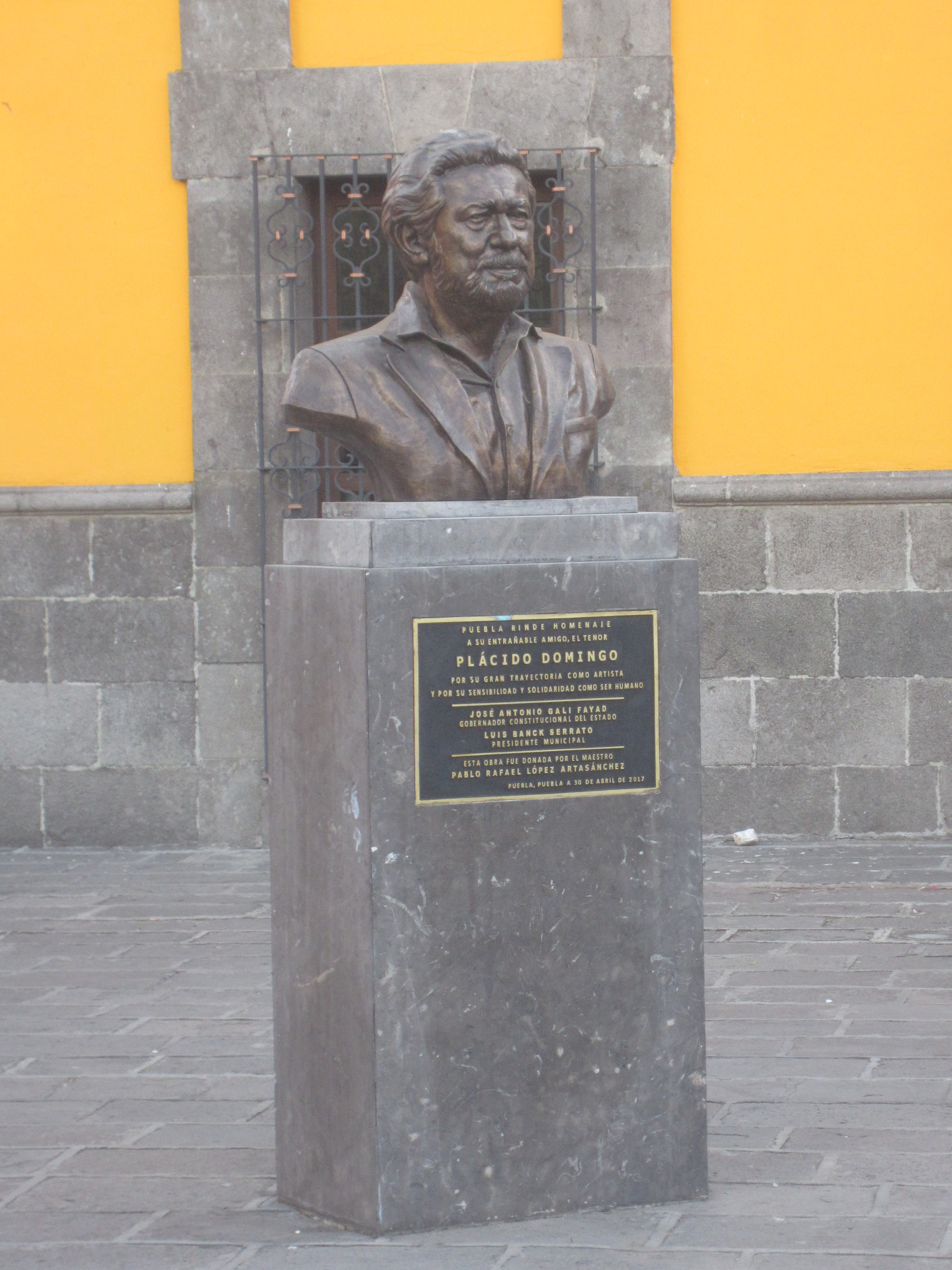
- The sculpture in 2018
- Year: 2017
- Subject: Plácido Domingo
- Location: Puebla, Puebla, Mexico; 19°2′41.3″N 98°11′31.7″W

The bust of Plácido Domingo is installed outside the Teatro Principal in Puebla's historic centre, in the Mexican state of Puebla. The sculpture was unveiled in 2017.
