= Monumento a la Victoria del 5 de Mayo =

Sculpture in Puebla, Mexico

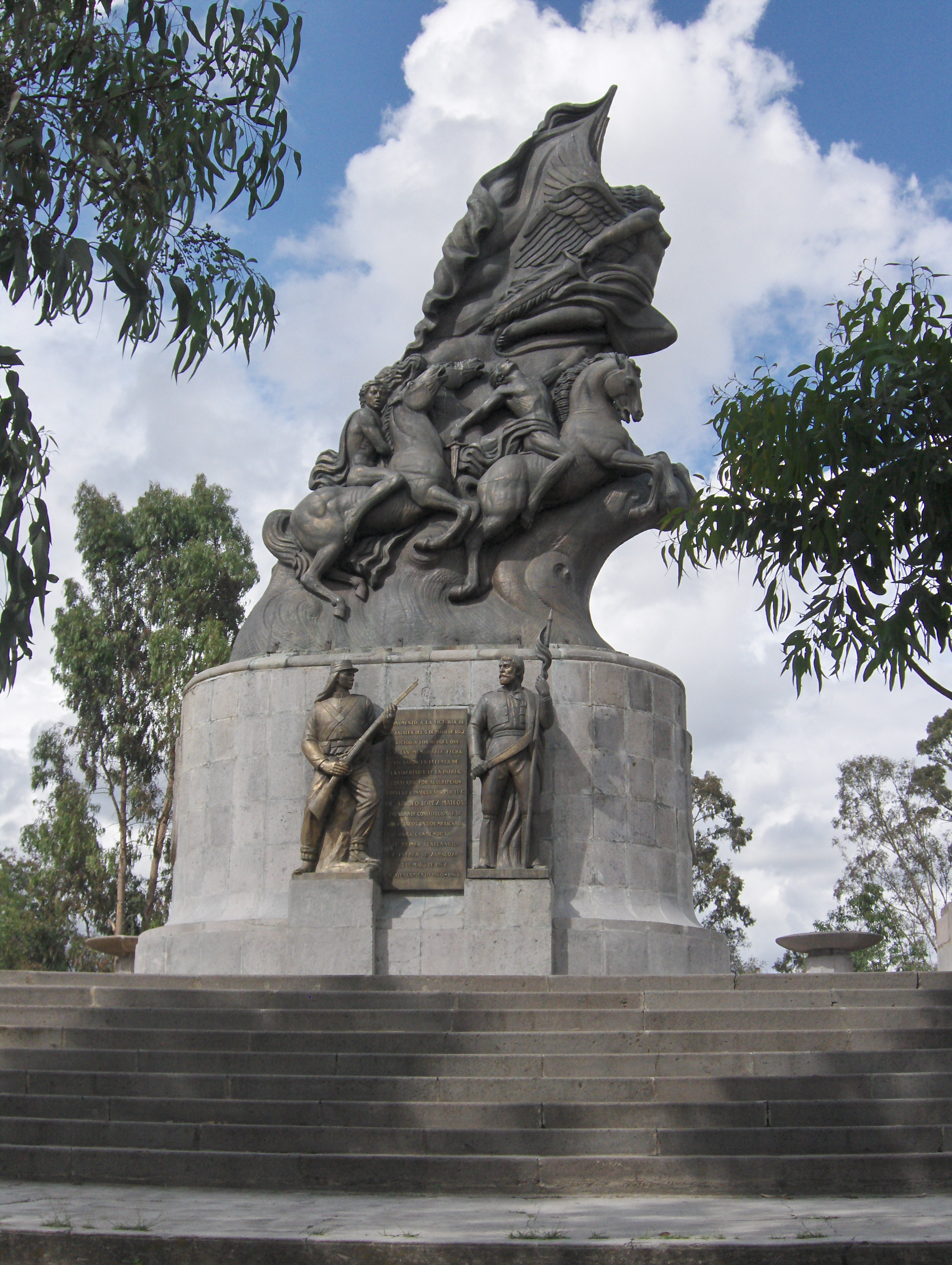
- The monument in 2008
- Location: Puebla, Puebla, Mexico; 19°3′15.3″N 98°10′52.4″W

The Monumento a la Victoria del 5 de Mayo is installed in the city of Puebla, Puebla, Mexico.
