= Statue of Héctor Azar =

Statue in Puebla, Mexico

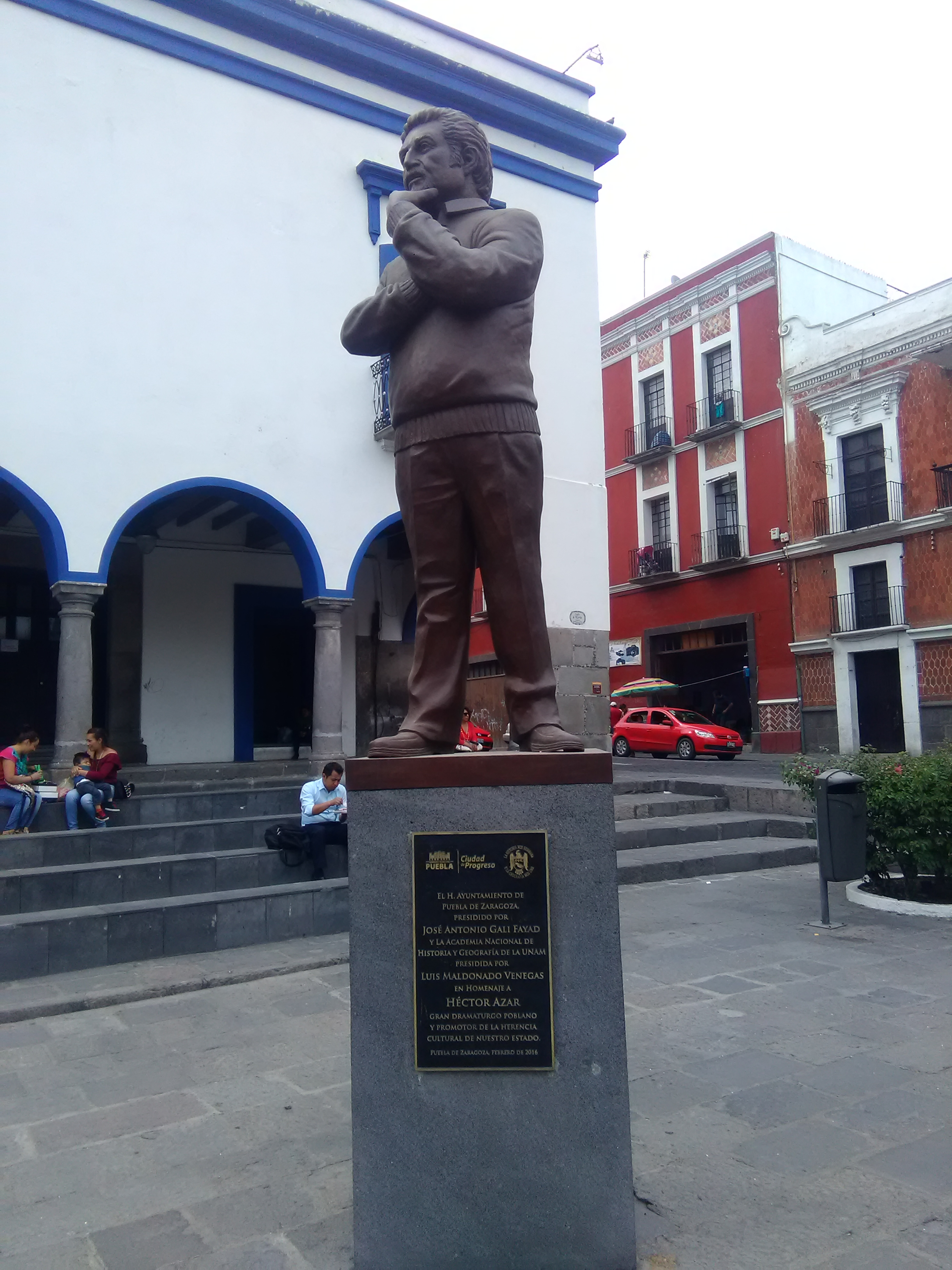
- The statue in 2017
- Subject: Héctor Azar
- Location: Puebla, Puebla, Mexico; 19°2′42.1″N 98°11′32.2″W

The statue of Héctor Azar is installed in the city of Puebla's historic centre, in the Mexican state of Puebla.

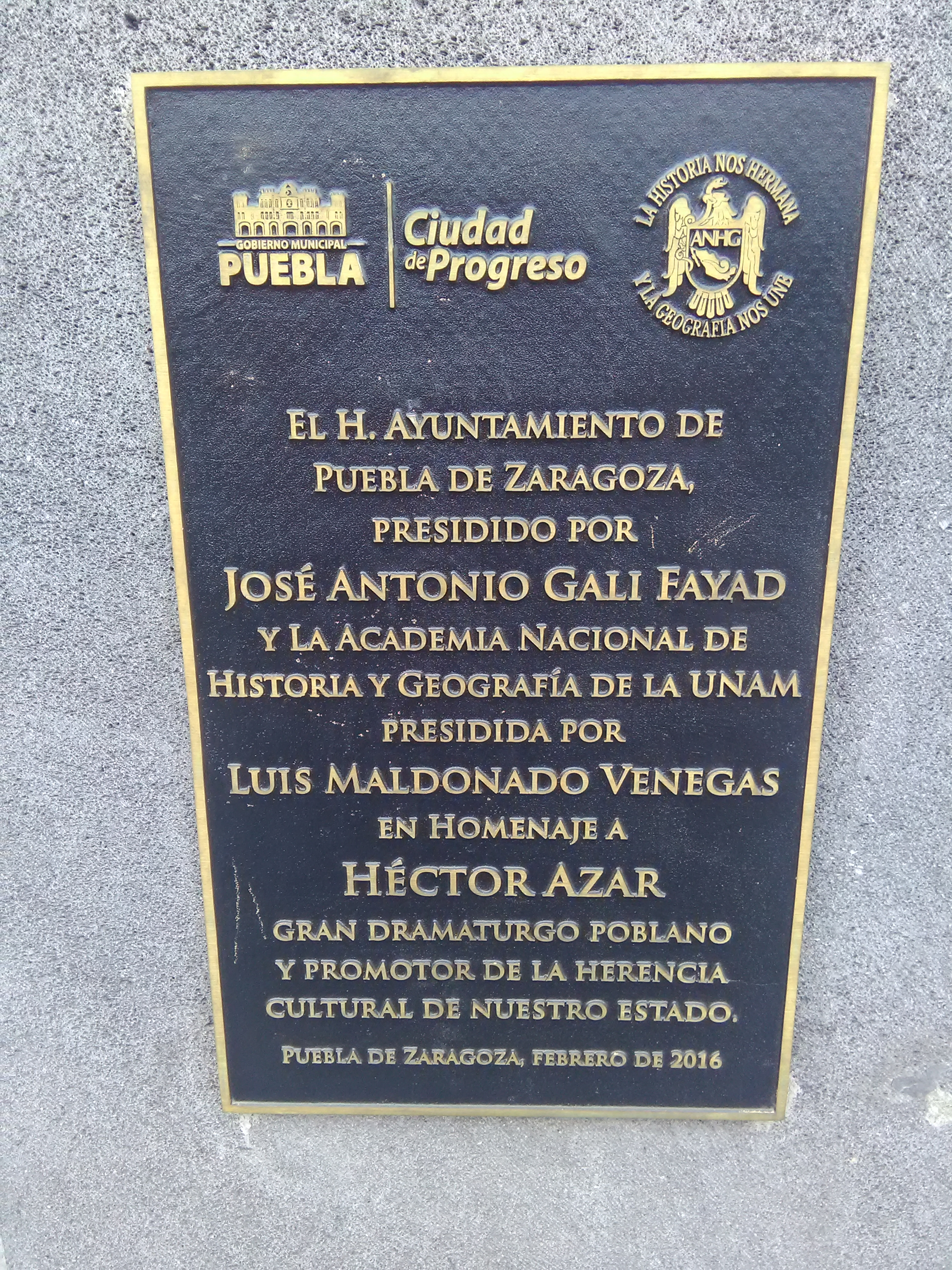
Plaque
