= Monumento al Sitio de Puebla =

Monument in Puebla, Mexico

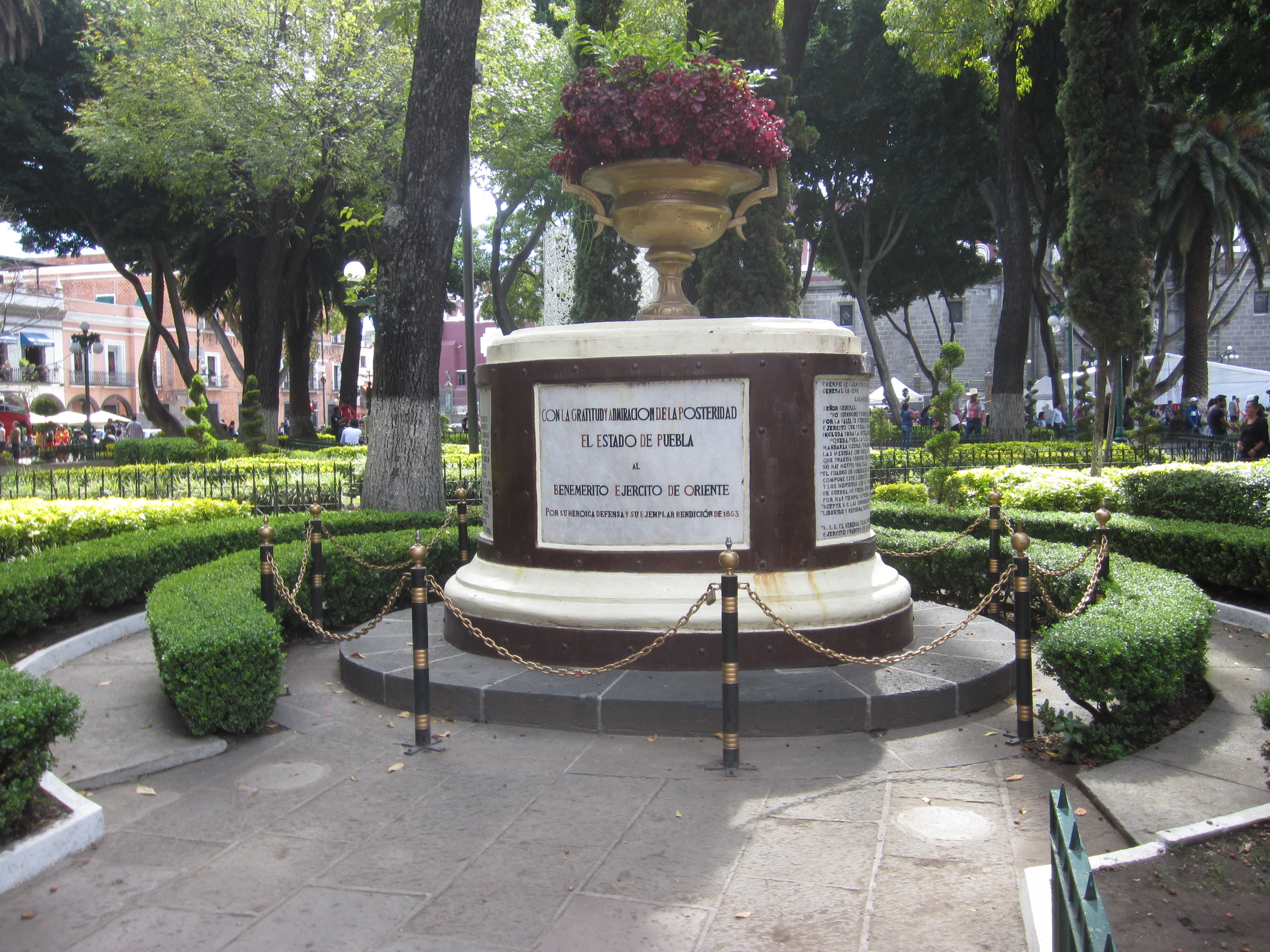
- The monument in 2018
- Location: Zócalo, Puebla, Puebla
- Coordinates: 19°2′37.6″N 98°11′51.8″W
- Type: Monument

The Monumento al Sitio de Puebla is a monument in the city of Puebla's Zócalo, in the Mexican state of Puebla.
