= Zócalo (Puebla) =

Park and plaza in Puebla, Mexico

Coordinates: 19°2′37″N 98°11′53″W

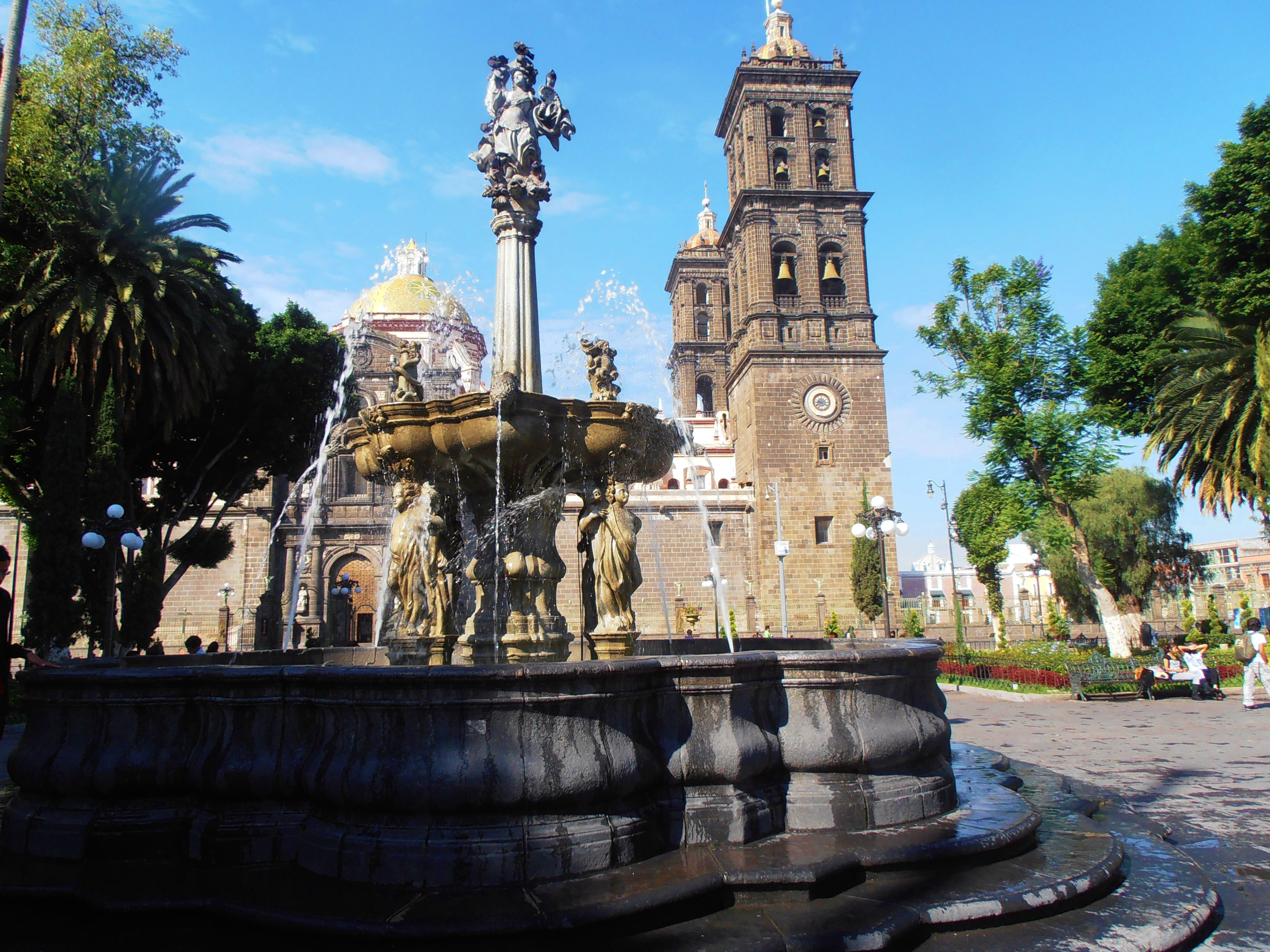
- Zócalo in Puebla
- Interactive map of Zócalo
- Type: Plaza
- Location: Puebla, Mexico

The Zócalo is a park and plaza in the historic center of Puebla, a city in the Mexican state of Puebla. It is right next to the Puebla Cathedral.

== Description and history ==
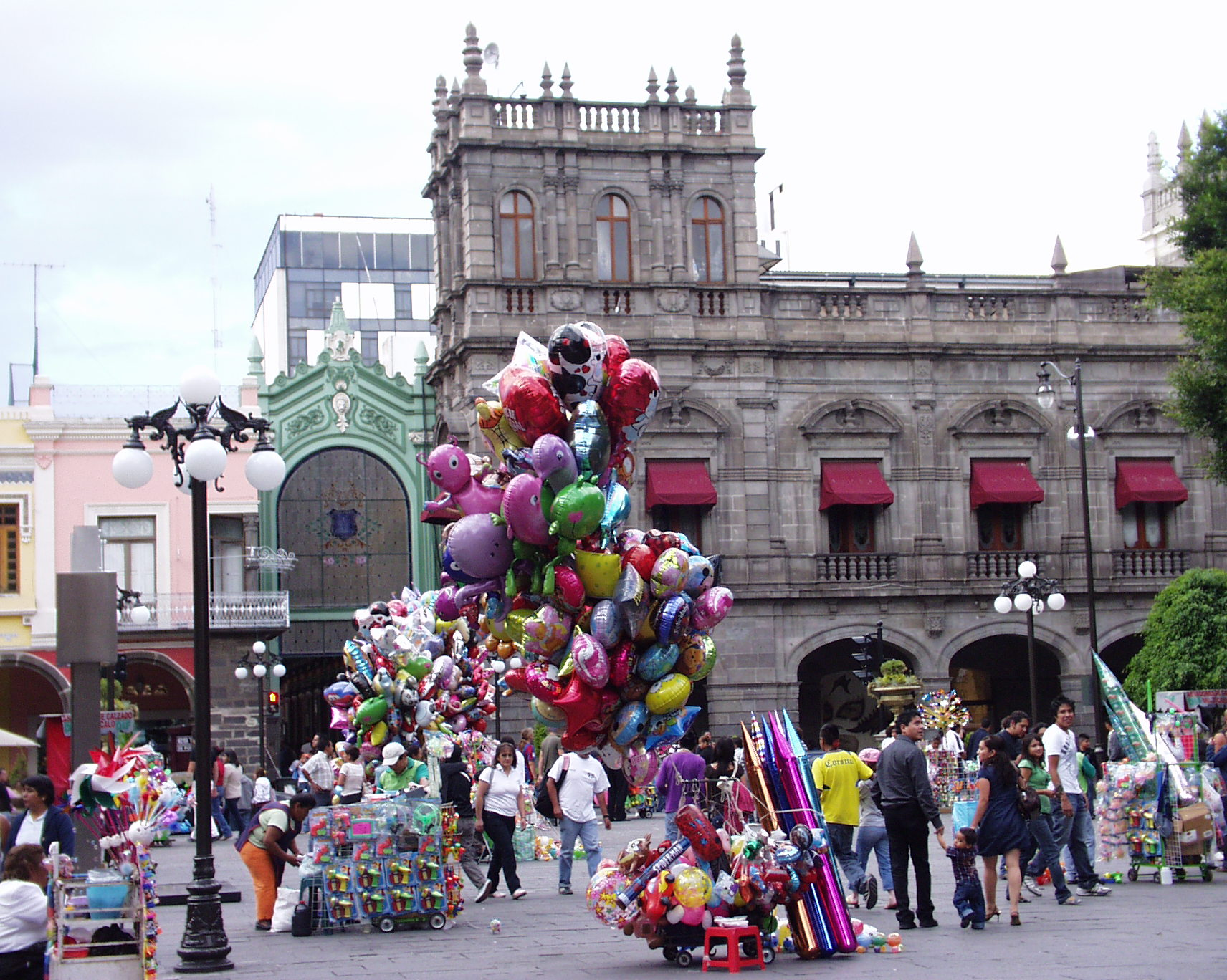
Toy balloon vendors in the plaza, 2009

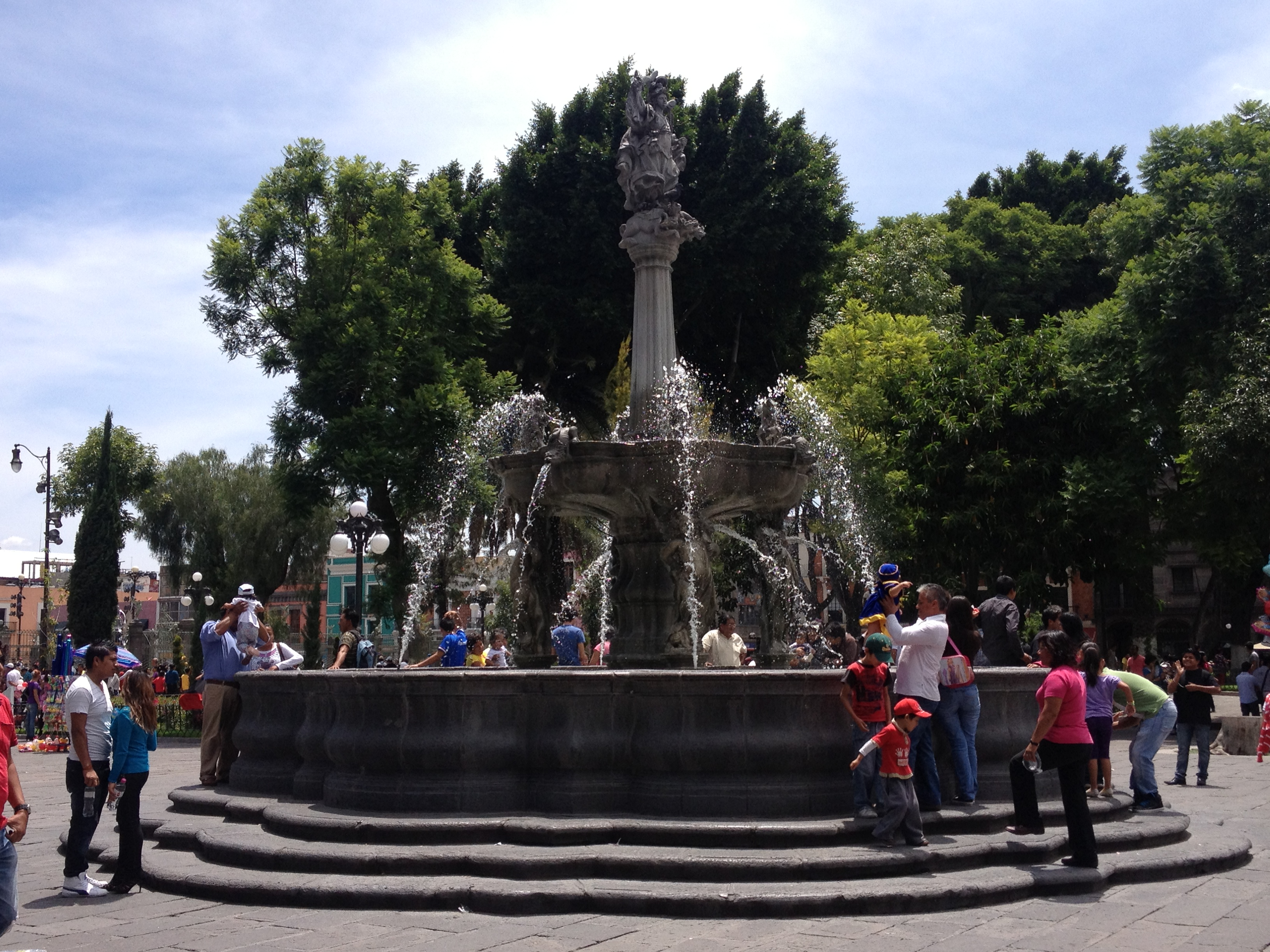
San Miguel Arcángel Fountain in 2013

The Zócalo, or main square, remains the cultural, political and religious center of the city. It was the first block to be laid out, with the rest of the historic center traced out from it in the form of a checkerboard. This main plaza originally was rectangular, but later made square because the earlier version was considered to be ugly. Until the end of the 18th century, this was the main market for the town. For much of the colonial period, it was the main source of potable water via a fountain that had been installed in the center in the mid-16th century. Many political and cultural events have been and continue to be held here. Bullfights were held in the main square from 1566 to 1722.

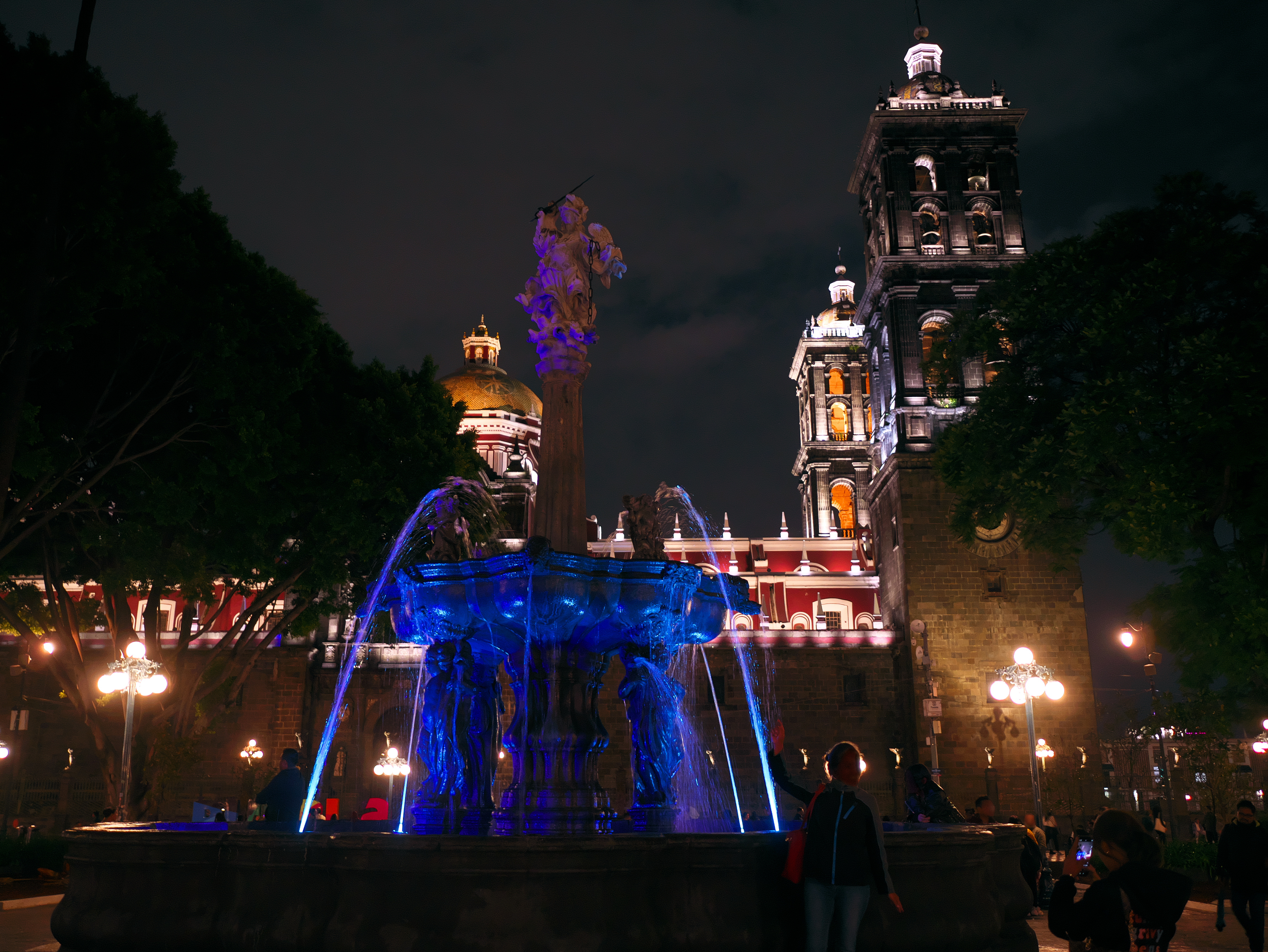
The Zócalo as seen at night

Today, the Zocalo is a tree-filled plaza and contains a large number of sculptures, but the most noted is the San Miguel Arcángel Fountain, placed in the center in 1777. Many notable buildings surround the Zocalo including City Hall, the Casa de los Muñecos and the Cathedral. Most of the streets in Puebla are named on a numbering system, which centers on the northwest corner of the Zocalo.

There are four statues of muses installed at each corner of the plaza. Jan Hendrix's sculpture, Kiosko, is installed in the plaza, along with the Monumento al Sitio de Puebla and Puebla de los Ángeles.

== See also ==
- Zócalo, Mexico City
