= Barrio del Artista =

- Neighbourhood
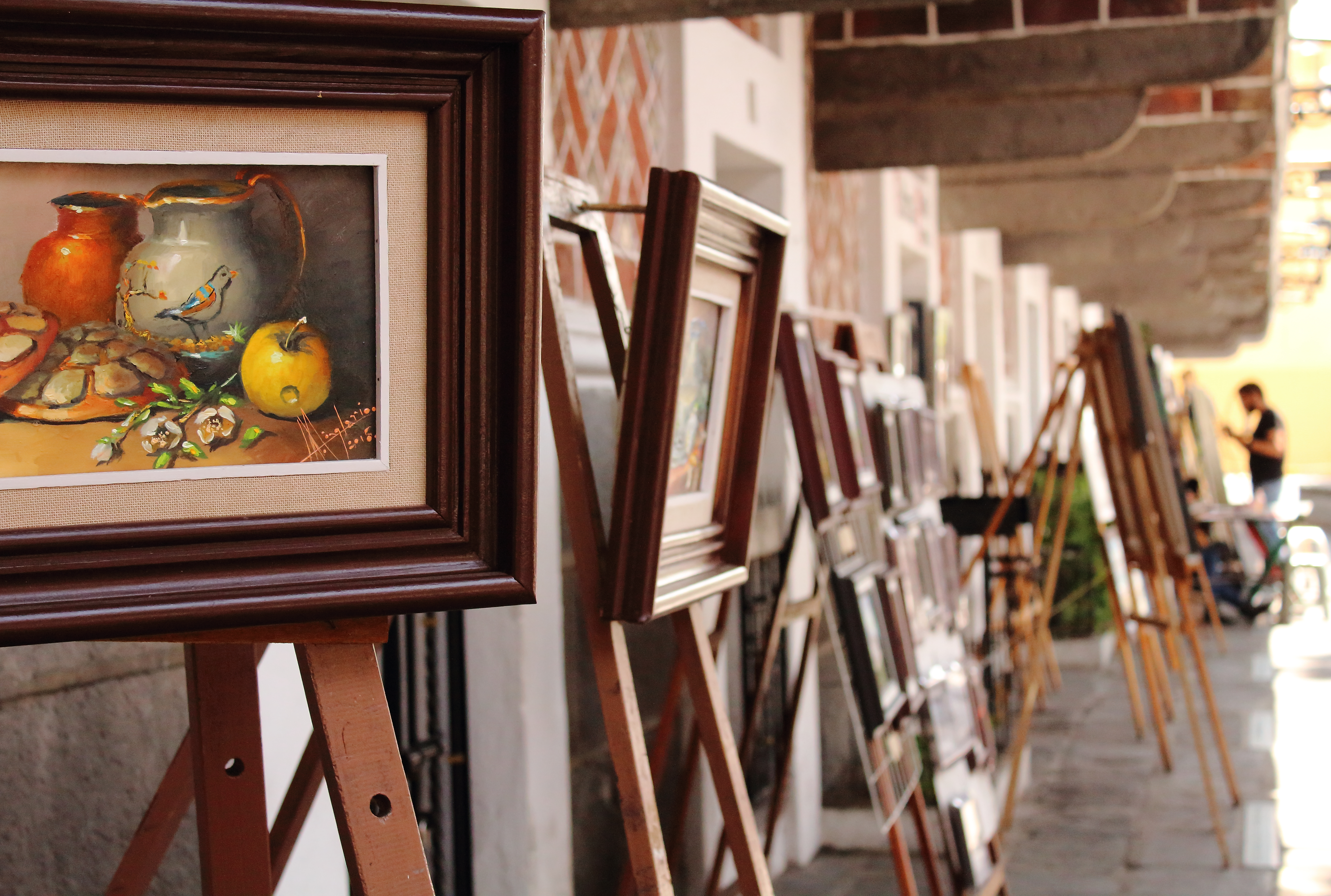
- Artworks displayed in the neighborhood, 2015

- Location within Mexico
- Coordinates: 19.044°N 98.192°W
- Country: Mexico
- State: Puebla
- City: Puebla

Barrio del Artista (English: "Artist's Neighborhood") is a neighborhood in the city of Puebla's historic centre, in the Mexican state of Puebla. The area has numerous spaces for artists to work and exhibit.
