= Puebla de los Ángeles (sculpture) =

Sculpture in Puebla, Mexico

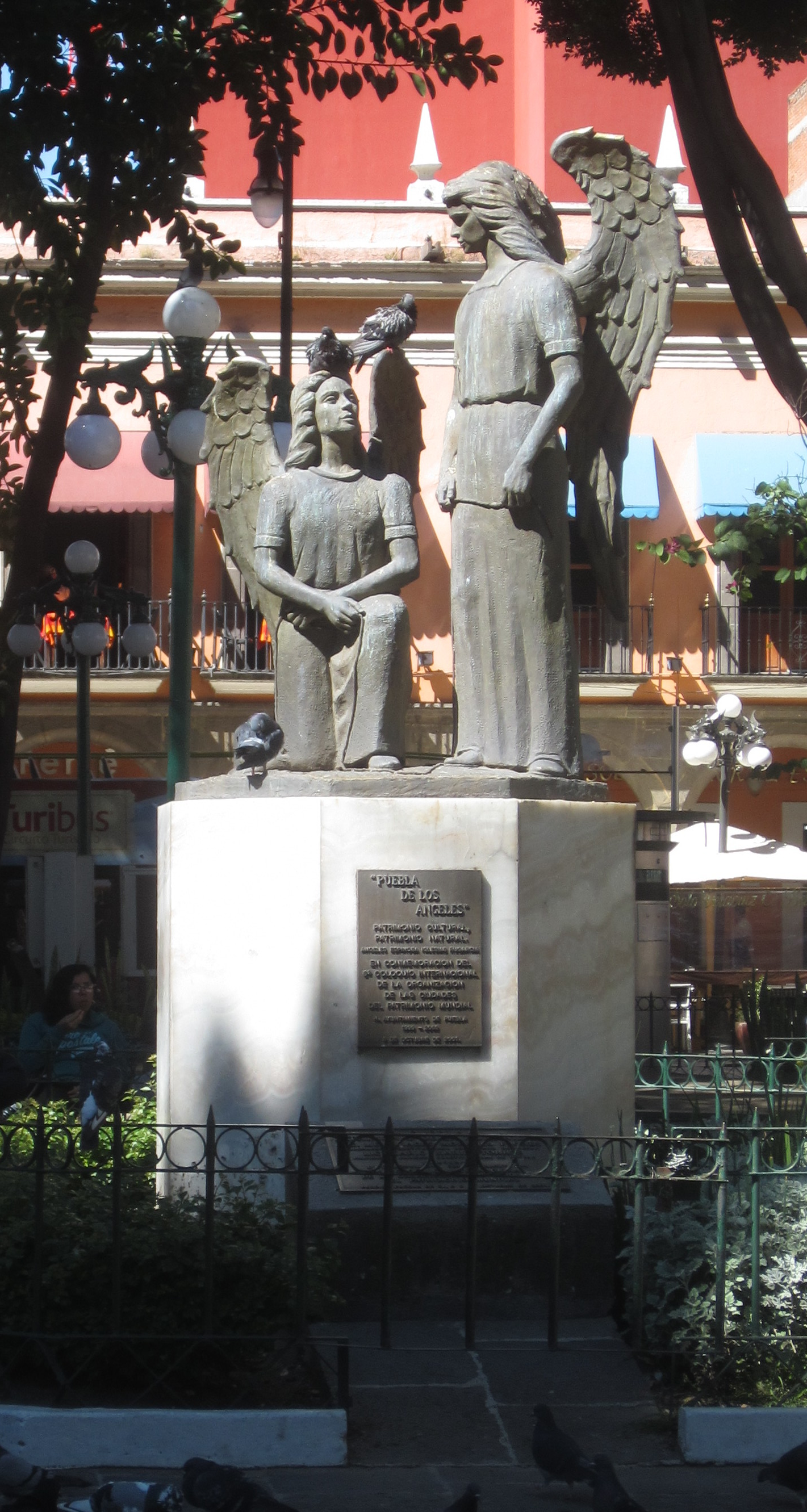
- The sculpture in 2018
- Location: Puebla, Puebla, Mexico
- 19°2′37.9″N 98°11′54.7″W

Puebla de los Ángeles is an outdoor sculpture installed in the city of Puebla's Zócalo, in the Mexican state of Puebla.
