= Statue of Esteban de Antuñano =

Statue in Puebla, Mexico

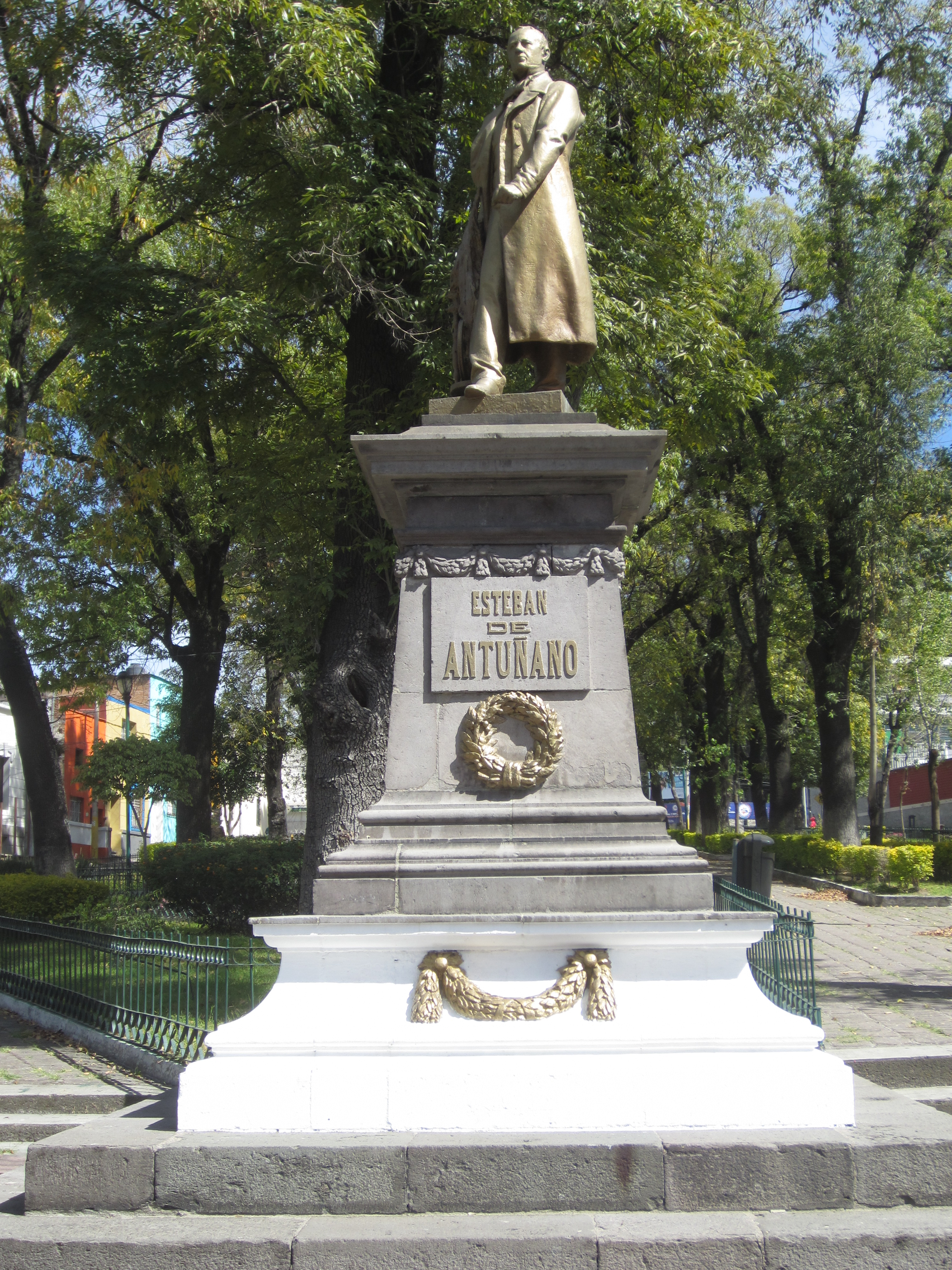
- The statue in 2018
- Subject: Esteban de Antuñano
- Location: Puebla, Puebla, Mexico; 19°2′54″N 98°11′18.4″W

The statue of Esteban de Antuñano is installed in the city of Puebla, Puebla, Mexico.
