= San Miguel Arcángel Fountain (Puebla) =

Fountain and sculpture in Puebla, Mexico

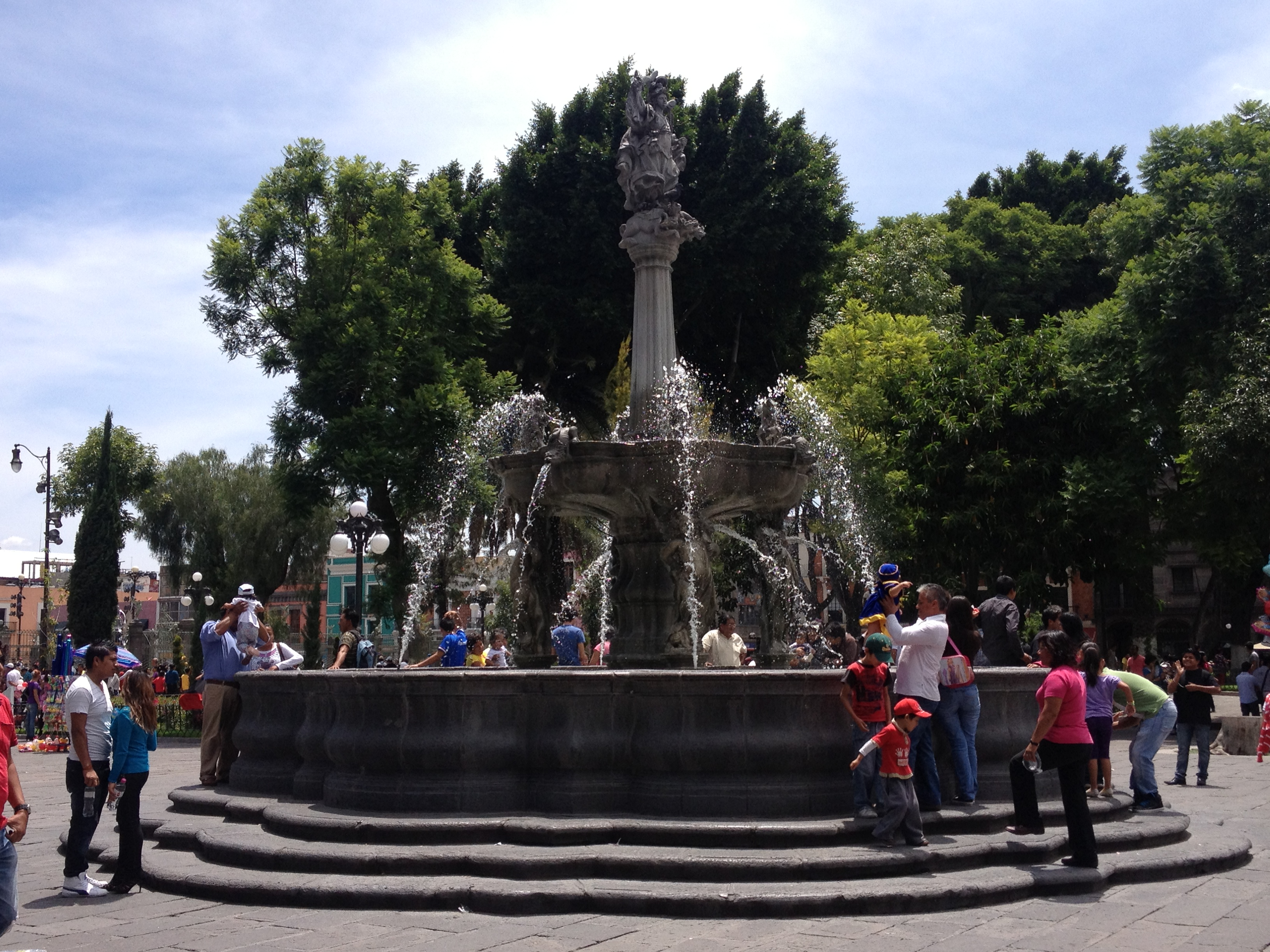
- The fountain 2013
- Location: Puebla, Puebla, Mexico; 19°2′37.3″N 98°11′53.4″W

San Miguel Arcángel Fountain is an 18th-century fountain installed in Puebla's Zócalo, in the Mexican state of Puebla. It was built in 1777 by architect Juan Antonio de Santamaría and stone carvers Anselmo Martínez and Francisco Rabanillo.

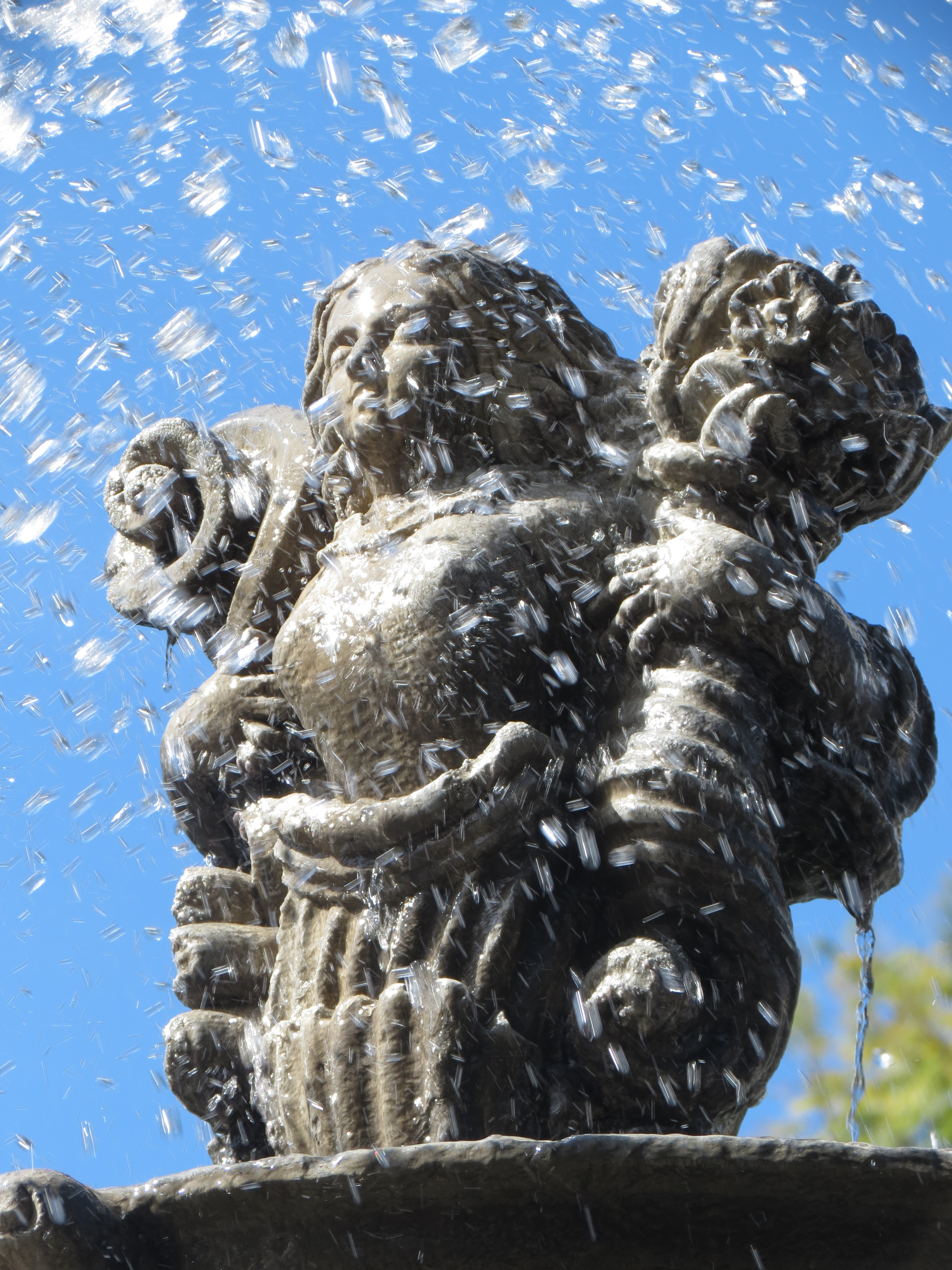
Detail of the sculpture, 2017

== See also ==
- San Miguel Arcángel Fountain (Cholula)
