= Puente de Ovando =

Bridge in Puebla, Mexico

Ovando Bridge Puente de Ovando
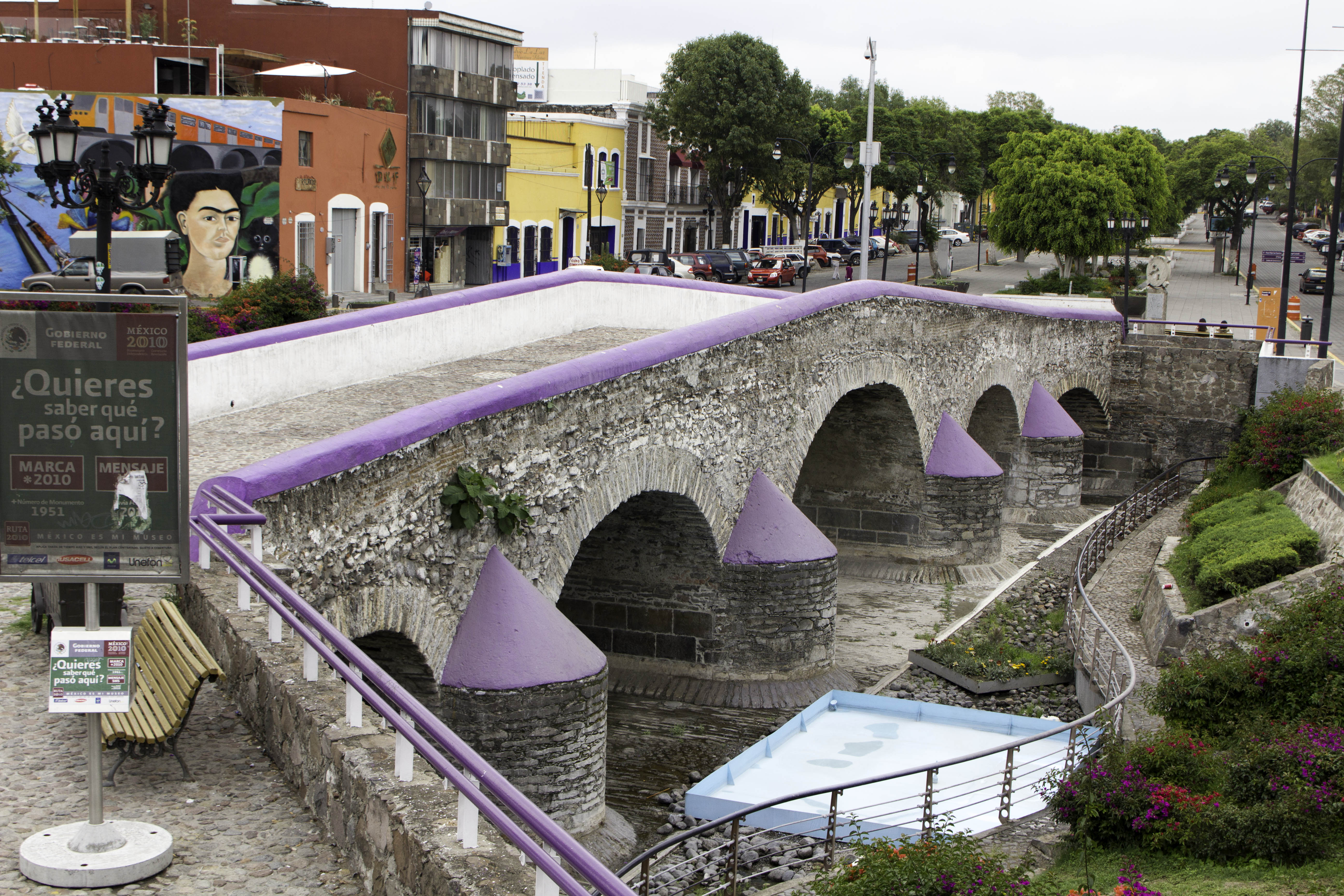
- The bridge in 2012
- Coordinates: 19°2′25.6″N 98°11′35.2″W
- Named for: Don Agustin de Ovando Villavicencio

History
- Construction end: c. 1775
- Replaces: Analco Bridge

The Puente de Ovando (English: Ovando Bridge) is a historic bridge in the city of Puebla, in the Mexican state of Puebla.

== Description and history ==
The Ovando Bridge is a small stone bridge across the river, in the Analco neighborhood of Puebla. The bridge was built in about 1775, replacing the old bridge that had fallen into disrepair, which connected the Spanish settlements with the downtown of Puebla. Next to the bridge was the house of the councilor Agustín de Ovando y Villavicencio, hence the name of the bridge. Today, the Ovando Bridge is one of the symbols of Puebla, a place full of stories and legends.

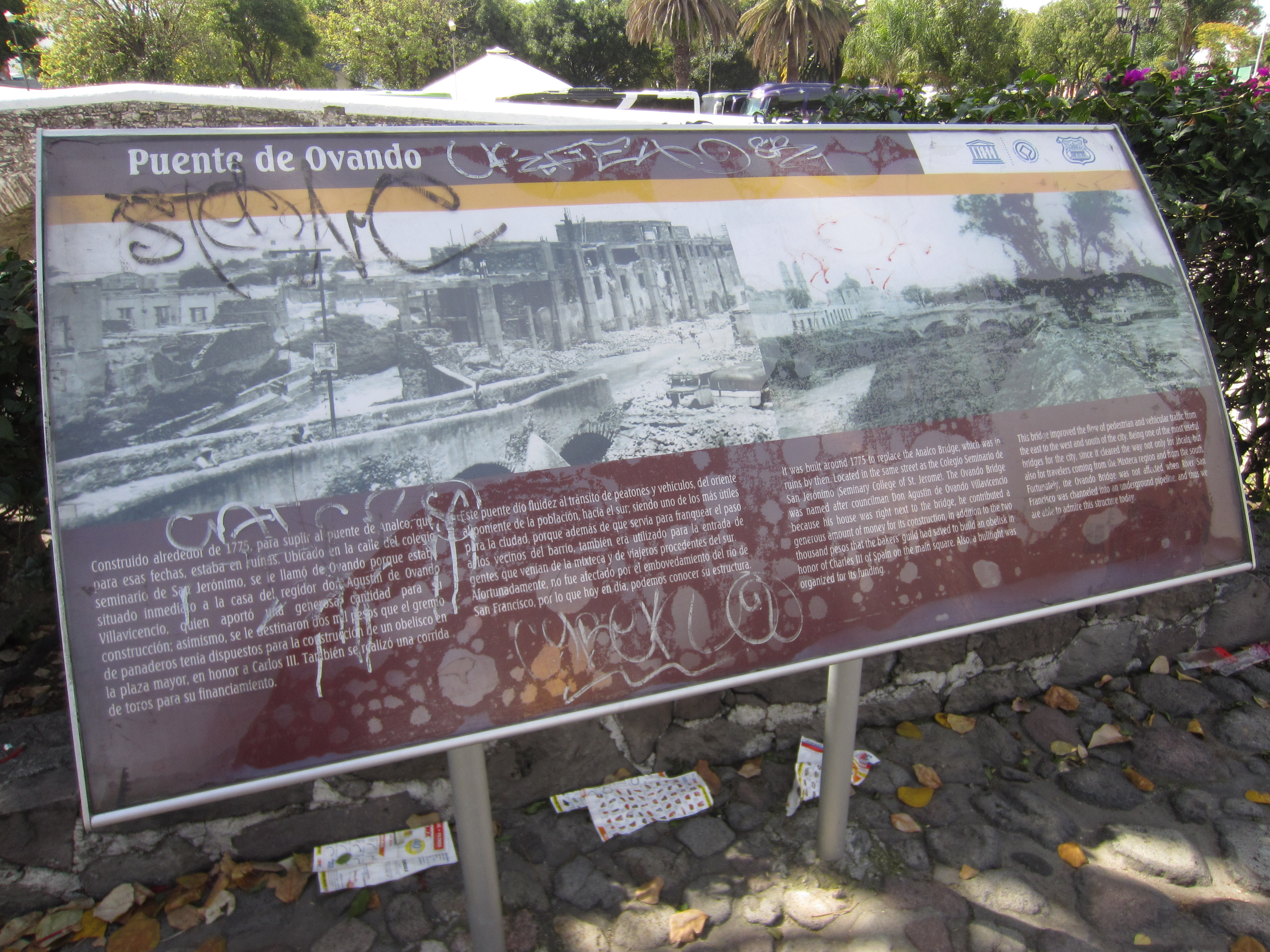
Signage
