= José Ramos =

José Ramos may refer to:

== Politics ==
- José Ramos Preto (1871–1949), Portuguese jurist and politician
- José Ramos Costa (1926–1989), President of Valencia CF, 1976–1984
- José Manuel Ramos Barroso (born 1928), Puerto Rican Senator
- José Ramos-Horta (born 1949), second President of East Timor

== Sports ==
=== Association football (soccer) ===
- José Ramos (Portuguese footballer) (born 1899), Portuguese football forward
- José Ramos (Argentine footballer) (1919–1969)
- José Ramos Delgado (1935–2010), Argentine footballer and football manager
- José Gerson Ramos (born 1981), Brazilian football midfielder
- José Ramos (Mexican footballer) (born 1987), Mexican-American footballer

=== Combat sports ===
- José Ramos (wrestler) (born 1949), Cuban wrestler
- Jose Ramos (boxing manager) (born 1965), Puerto Rican boxing manager
- José Ramos (judoka) (born 1994), Guatemalan judoka

=== Other sports ===
- Cheo Ramos (José Ramos, fl. 1910s–1920s), Cuban baseball player
- José Ramos (runner) (born 1968), Portuguese long-distance runner
- José Ramos Castillo (born 1974), Spanish paralympic swimmer
- José Giovanni Ramos (born 1983), Venezuelan sprint canoer
- José Ramos (baseball) (born 2001), Panamanian baseball player

== Others ==
- José Ramos Muñoz, Spanish archaeologist and professor of prehistory
- José Ramos Tinhorão (1928–2021), Brazilian journalist, essayist, music critic, music historian, and author
- José Luis Ramos (1790–1849), Venezuelan writer
