= Francisco Antonio de Guerrero y Torres =

Mexican architect

- Born: 1727; Villa de Guadalupe, Mexico
- Died: 1792 (aged 65); Mexico City
- Occupation: Architect
- Buildings: El Pocito chapel, Santiago Calimaya counts' palace, Jaral de Berrio Marquise's palace, La Enseñanza Church

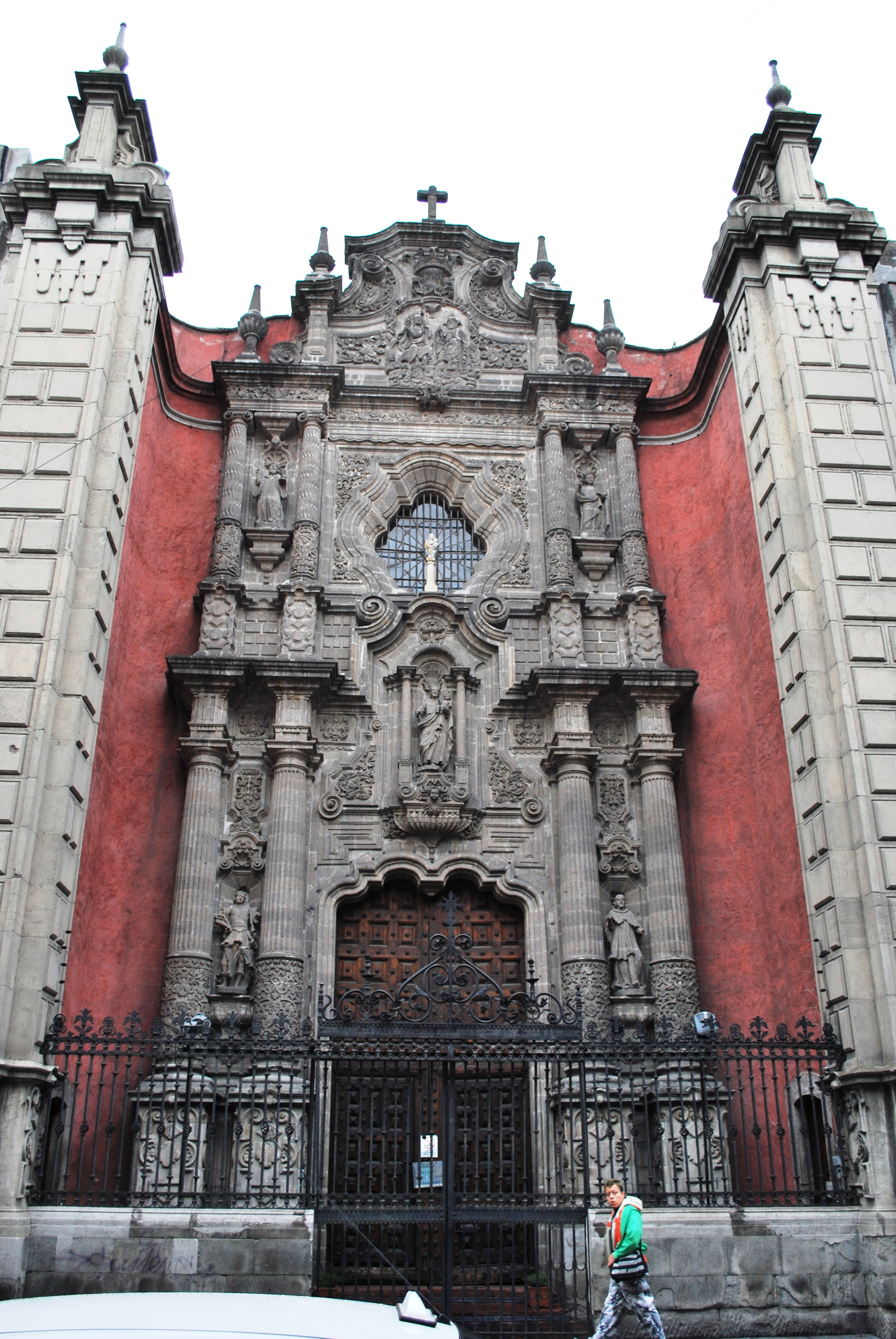
La Enseñanza church

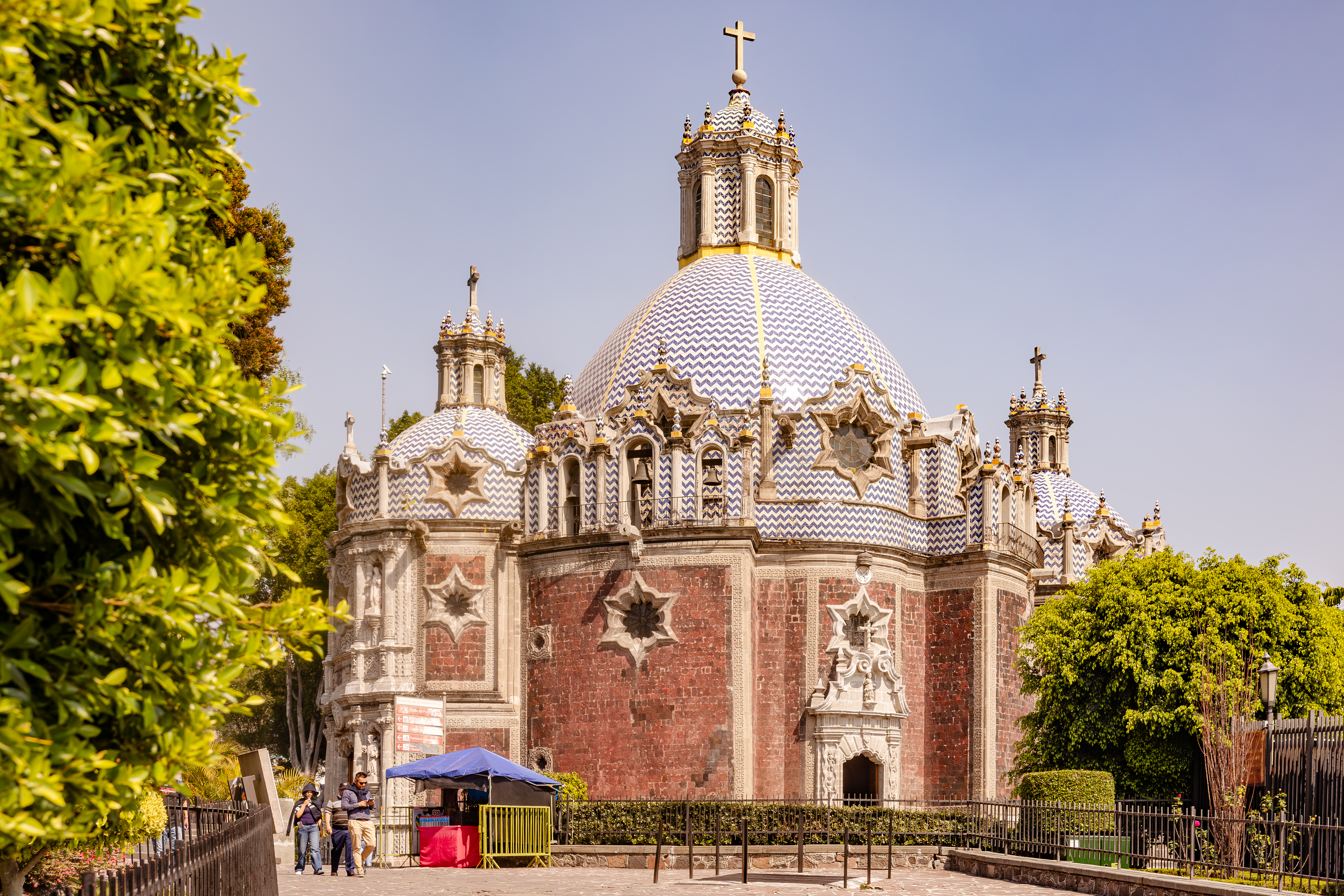
El Pocito chapel

Francisco Antonio de Guerrero y Torres (Villa de Guadalupe, 1727 – Muy Noble y Leal Ciudad de México, 1792) was a Mexican Baroque architect who was prominent in Mexico City, the capital of New Spain. He built several palaces and buildings at the basilica devoted to Our Lady of Guadalupe.

He was the major developer of the Galante Style, by which he translated the Rococo into Mexican terms. An apprentice of Lorenzo Rodríguez, Guerrero y Torres participated, in 1753, in the construction of the Our Lady of Guadalupe Shrine. The main architect was Pedro de Arrieta.

== Early life and education ==
Francisco Antonio de Guerrero y Torres was born in Villa de Guadalupe in 1727. He was schooled by tutors. Interested in buildings, he apprenticed to Lorenzo Rodríguez. At the age of 26, he took part in design and construction of Our Lady of Guadalupe Shrine, under the lead architect Pedro de Arrieta.

== Works ==
Guerrero y Torres built a palace for the Count of San Mateo de Valparaíso, with construction lasting from December 5, 1769 to May 9, 1772. It was on the site of a former 16th-century mansion, part of redevelopment of the historic center of the city. This work gave Guerrero y Torres such fame that he was named Maestro Mayor del Real Palacio, de la Catedral y del Tribunal de la Santa Fe (Major Master of the Royal Palace, the Cathedral and the Inquisition Headquarters). As the count had wished, he designed the palace in a pure "Mexican" style, with materials from the region. It had grey Chiluca limestone structural elements (such as doorposts, gargoyles and cornices), while the external walls were covered with red tezontle (a porous volcanic stone) and blue details of talavera poblana (azulejos from Puebla).

Between 1779 and 1785, he built a new palace for the Marquise of Jaral de Berrio, the only daughter of the Countess of San Mateo de Valparaíso. Replacing a 16th-century mansion, this palace had two towers in its frontal corners (it used to be customary to have one tower; doubling the number indicated the owner's great wealth). The palace is today known as the Palace of Iturbide.

He also built the Pocito chapel (chapel of the little well), in the Our Lady of Guadalupe Shrine complex, as an ex-voto. Neither he nor the contractors charged a fee, and the materials were contributed through donations by the people and the bishop. This chapel was designed in the so-called “transition Baroque” style, because it contained elements of the Later Baroque, mixed with elements which belonged to the incipient Neoclassic style.

Doña María Ignacia de Azlor y Echeverz, daughter of the Aguayo marquis and mother superior of a girls’ school, commissioned Guerrero y Torres to build La Enseñanza Church (1772–1778). The arch that marks the end of the bass-chorus (an arch that develops into three arches) is reminiscent of that beginning the great staircase in the Santiago Calimaya counts’ palace. The floor plan of La Enseñanza resembles that of the ‘‘Pocito’’ chapel. None of Guerrero y Torres' architectural drawings survived. The church holds the drawings for later modifications by Ignacio Castera (who made renovations in the Neoclassical style). Castera may have built the Capuchin convent, but the Baroque temple is believed to have been done by another. These were not built until 1795, three years after Guerrero y Torres’ death.

The work of Guerrero y Torres led to Mexico City becoming known as the "town of palaces". Though the phrase is commonly attributed to the baron Alexander von Humboldt, it has been documented as by the English traveler Charles La Trobe.

== Notable works ==
All in Mexico City, these include:

- The San Mateo Valparaíso counts' palace (Venustiano Carranza Street and Isabel la Católica St.)
- Our Lady of the Pillar, better known as La Enseñanza (1772–1778) (102 Donceles St.)
- The Jaral de Berrio marquise's palace (1779 to 1785) (Madero St.)
- The Santiago Calimaya counts' palace (Pino Suárez St.)
- The two Houses of the Guerrero d'Ávila's Mayorazgo (Moneda St. and El Carmen St.)
- The Pulque Customs, in which was the gate of the City (Peralvillo St. and Reforma St.)
- The El Pocito Chapel (the Little Well chapel), in the complex of Our Lady of Guadalupe Villa (town)
