= Houses of the Mayorazgo de Guerrero =

Historic buildings in Mexico City

Coordinates: 19°26′0.64″N 99°7′47.74″W

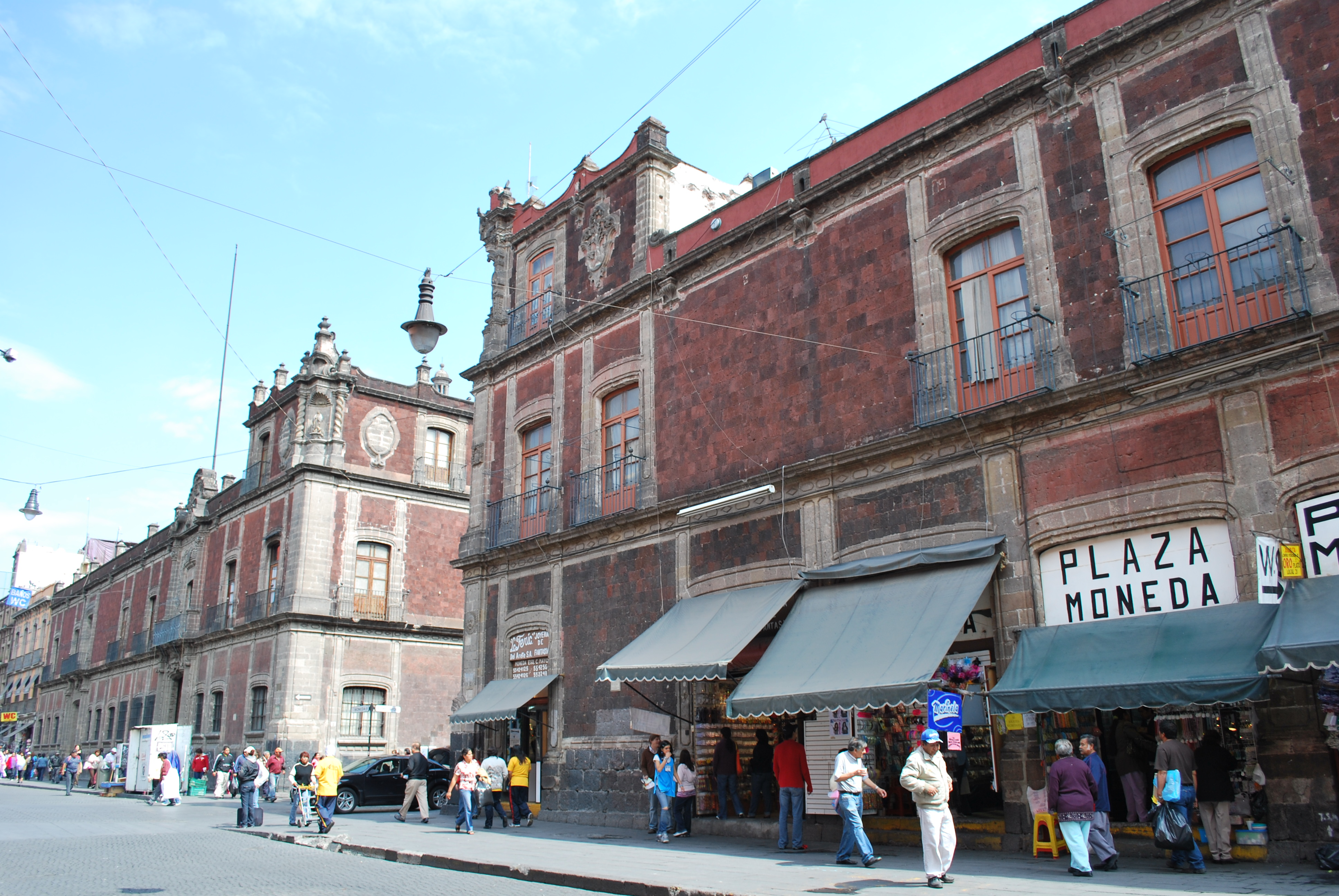
View of the twin structures

The Houses of the Mayorazgo de Guerrero are historic buildings at 16 and 18 Moneda Street in Mexico City, located across from the Museum of Cultures in the historic center of the city and near Correo Mayor.

The two buildings are nearly twins, both with tezontle stone facades and white stone accents. The houses were founded by the family of Juan Guerrero de Luna in the 16th century, and stayed in the family all through the colonial period as a permanent grant of the Spanish Crown. The current appearance of the buildings is due to rebuilding which was realized in the late 18th century. After Independence, the two houses gradually fell out of family hands, with the main house serving various public functions and the smaller house becoming apartments and shops.

== History ==
The two houses were founded in the 16th century by Juan Guerrero de Luna and his wife Beatriz Gomez Davila, after receiving a grant of the land to the family by Spanish king Felipe II. The land and houses would stay in the family all through the colonial period. The original structures were built in the 16th century, but what remains now was a rebuilding of the houses done near the end of the 18th century by architect Francisco Antonio Guerrero y Torres. The western house was the one that the family lived in, with the east house reserved to house domestic staff as well as storage. Areas here were also rented to merchants. While the two buildings look similar, the western house contains most of the distinctive features.

By the end of the 19th century, the eastern, or servants’ house was already converted into apartments and stores. Artist José Guadalupe Posada lived and worked in this building from the end of the 19th century until his death in 1913 after losing his former studios. Living and working here allowed him to observe the daily lives of ordinary people, which was reflected in his work from this time.

In 1914, the main house became the site of the National Conservatory of Music of Mexico and would remain in the building for about thirty years. While the main house may have been quite large as a home, it was considered a bit small to house a school, with the only place to put a basketball court being one of the two interior patios. In 1933, Rufino Tamaño painted a fresco here, dedicated to music, especially singing, for the Conservatory. The Conservatory is now located in the Polanco neighborhood.

In the 1980s, the main house was being used by the Dept of Prehistory of the Instituto Nacional de Antropología e Historia, with the servants’ building accommodating shops and apartments. The main building today belongs to the Secretariat of Public Education with the servants’ building still occupied by tenants and merchants.

== Description ==
The main house lacks many of the spectacular architectural details that distinguish other residences such as the Palace of Iturbide, but it does have a number of interesting elements. This building has two floors with a parapet at one corner of the property. The facade is of tezontle, a blood-red porous volcanic stone, with the windows, balconies, doorways and baseboards of the building done in chiluca, a grayish-white stone. Many of the relieves on the building, especially the parapet, pay homage to the Virgin Mary. Her image appears here and the corner pilasters are decorated with relieves of lilies and roses which are associated with her. On the upper floor, there are two square compartments: one with a fountain and one with a well. The parapet has a niche with an image of the Virgin, flanked by two semi-detached estipite (inverted truncated pyramid) columns with Corinthian capitals formed by acanthus leaves. This was very common to the religious architecture of the Counter Reformation period as they allude to eternity and the glory of the Virgin Mary. The parapet is also decorated with an ivory tower design and a palm tree framed by elaborate Baroque mouldings.

Inside, the building has two patios with independent entrances to the street as well as a doorway that connect them to each other In the main stairwell is a fresco done by Rufino Tamaño from 1933 which is dedicated to music.

== House of the Sun and Moon ==
However, the most distinctive decoration of the house is outside and gives the house the alternate name of “Houses of the Sun and Moon.” They are reliefs of the sun and the moon on the corner that is at the intersection of Moneda and Correo Mayor Streets. These, too, are a reference to the Virgin Mary, as she is said to be “as beautiful as the moon and as bright as the sun.” However, these images, as well as the names of the family associated with the property have given rise to a legend as to their existence. This legend says that there was a viceroy, who was quite fond of wild parties, inviting the highest-class families of New Spain. This viceroy gave the wife of Don Enrique de Luna, Doña Sol de Olmedo, a sumptuous mansion located very close to the Viceroy's Palace as a token of appreciation for their “platonic” relationship. Luna became jealous over the gift and, according to the story, had the house completely demolished to its foundations. He then built in its place a new and even more sumptuous house there for his wife. Furthermore, to show to her that their names were forever linked, he had the reliefs of the sun (“sol” means sun) and moon (“luna” means moon) at the corner where the two main facades meet. This action caused the viceroy to permanently break off his relationship with the couple.
