= Ana Ugalde =

Mexican painter (born 1925)

- Born: 1925; San Juan del Río, Querétaro, Mexico
- Known for: Painting

Ana Ugalde (born 1925) is a Mexican painter.

== Early life and education ==
Uglade was born in 1925 in San Juan del Río, Querétaro. She studied painting under José Ramos Castillo and Prometeo Barragán.

== Career ==
In 1951, Ugalde painted the murals for the Museo Regional de San Diego in Acapulco. Ugalde's first exhibition was the Galería del Grupo Preparatoriano 20-24 show of 1958. In 1959 she was among the artists who produced work for the temple museum annex of the Castillo de Chapultepec; others included Martha Rojas, Enrique Carreón, and Antonio López Sáenz.

In 1963 she was among those hired to produce decorative works for the pre-Hispanic rooms of the Museum of the City of Mexico, alongside Martha Rojas, Héctor Trillo, and her former teacher Barragán. In 1964 she was one of the artists who assembled and decorated the Oaxaca Room of the National Museum of Anthropology.

Ugalde's work, Sirena, is held in the permanent collection of the Magdalena Mondragón Museum.

Ugalde has also worked as an art restorer, and offers classes in restoration and painting in addition to continuing her easel work.
