= Palace of the Counts of San Bartolomé de Xala =

18th-century palace in the historic center of Mexico City

- Palacio de los Condes de San Bartolomé de Xala
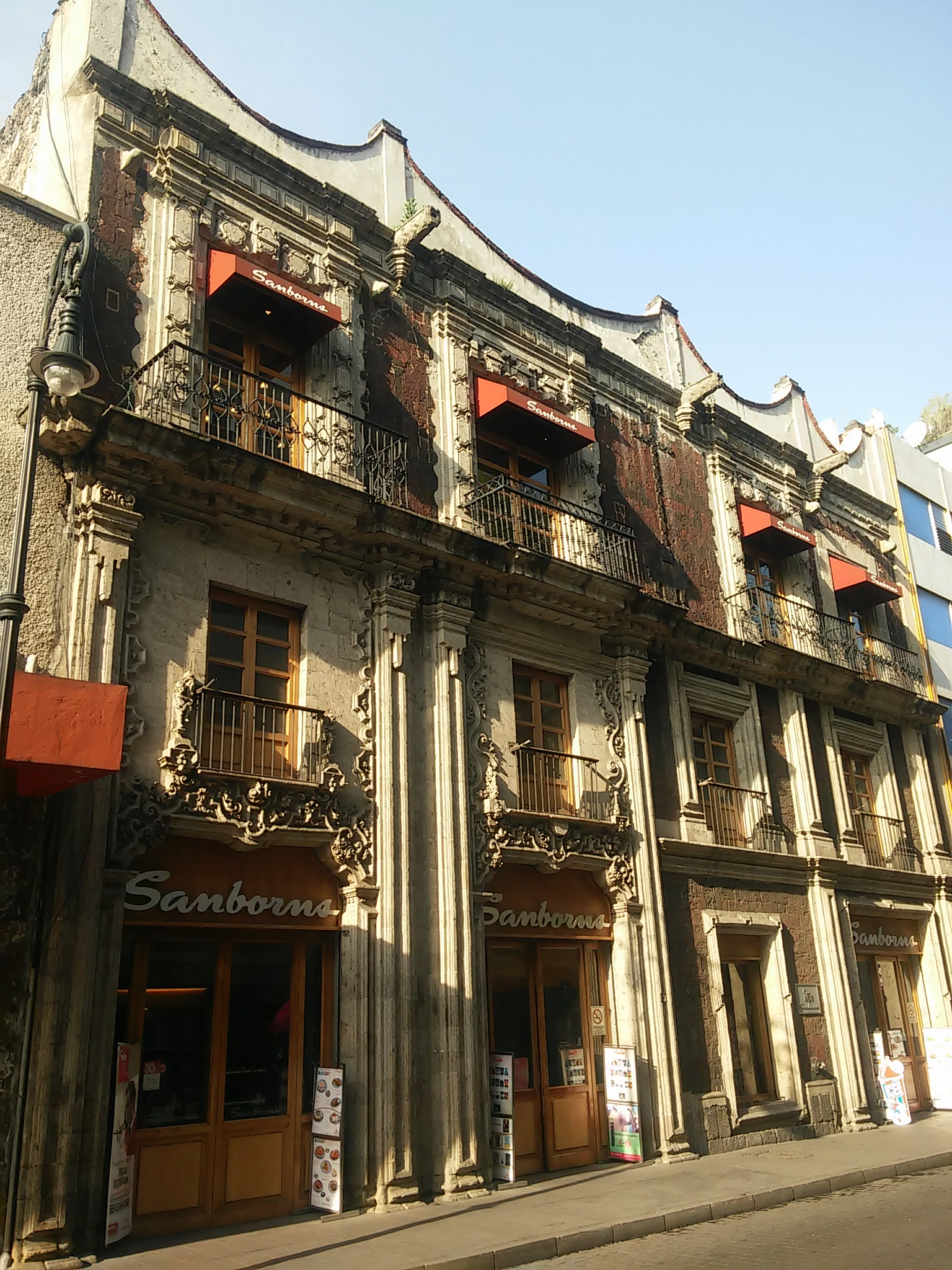
- The façade on Venustiano Carranza Street

General information
- Type: Palace
- Architectural style: Baroque
- Location: Venustiano Carranza 73, Centro, Mexico City, Mexico
- Coordinates: 19.43107°N 99.13535°W
- Current tenants: Sanborns
- Year built: 1763–1764
- Renovated: 2012

Design and construction
- Architect: Lorenzo Rodríguez

The Palace of the Counts of San Bartolomé de Xala (Palacio de los Condes de San Bartolomé de Xala) is an 18th-century town house at Venustiano Carranza 73 in the historic center of Mexico City. It was built in 1763–1764 for the counts of San Bartolomé de Xala to designs by the architect Lorenzo Rodríguez. Since 2012 it has housed a branch of the Sanborns store and restaurant chain.

== History ==
The title of Count of San Bartolomé de Xala was granted by Ferdinand VI to Manuel Rodríguez Sáenz de Pedroso, a merchant from La Rioja who had settled in Mexico City in 1718. Sources differ on which member of the family built the house. González Gamio and México Desconocido credit the first count, while the historian Manuel Romero de Terreros, in his 1957 study of the house, gave the builder as Antonio Rodríguez de Pedroso y Soria, the second count.

According to an inscription in the building, work began on January 1, 1763 and was completed on July 31, 1764; an arch in the interior carries the dates of construction and the architect's name. The nuns of the neighbouring Capuchin convent went to law to stop the work, complaining that the house was too tall and would overlook their convent, but lost the case. According to González Gamio, the count left the house to his daughter, who married the second Count of Regla.

During the 19th century the house changed hands several times and fell into disrepair; its rooms were used as carriage houses, stables, lodgings and kitchens. In 1964 it passed from the Banco Mercantil to a private owner, who let it out as small shops but made no major alterations, keeping the tiled wainscot of the staircase and a carved stone figure of a Black page in livery. The businessman Carlos Slim later bought the building and had it restored, including its stonework, tiles, courtyard paving, ironwork and fountain, and it reopened as a Sanborns in 2012. González Gamio welcomed the restoration but regretted that the original paint had been removed from the figure on the staircase.

== Architecture ==
The three-storey façade is of tezontle with carved stone dressings and two tall carved doorways. The main doorway is framed by a diamond pattern, and the first-floor windows open onto balconies with wrought-iron railings. Reviewing Romero de Terreros's study, E. Boyd described the façade as restrained in its ornament in a way that is characteristically Spanish. The main courtyard is surrounded by galleries on the upper floors, two of them carried on wide arches, and a stone fountain stands against a wall of the rear courtyard.

Romero de Terreros based his account of the house on the inventory drawn up after the death of the countess in 1784, which ran to 256 folios. The family lived on the upper floor, while the ground floor and mezzanine held service rooms, offices, stables and stores; no family rooms faced the street. The house had a carriage entrance, a courtyard with a fountain, a washhouse, a porter's lodge and two tiled staircases with iron railings. Thirteen rooms on the upper floor looked onto a small patio and the main courtyard. They included a formal parlour whose furniture and walls were covered in yellow damask, a canopy room off the parlour in which a portrait of the reigning king was displayed, and a private chapel for which Pope Clement XIV gave permission in 1769.
