= Museum of Mexico City =

History and art museum in Mexico City, Mexico

- Museo de la Ciudad de Mexico
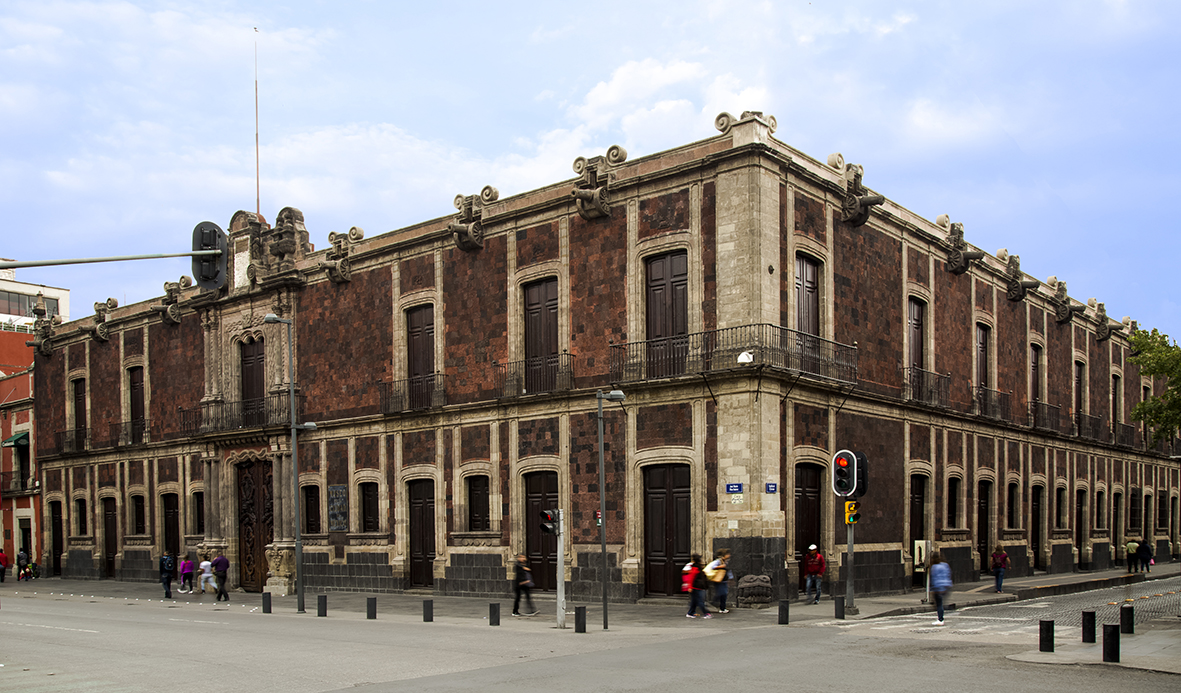
- Façade of the palace
- Former name: House of the counts of Santiago de Calimaya
- Established: 31 October 1964; 61 years ago
- Location: Historic center of Mexico City, Mexico City
- Coordinates: 19°25′45.12″N 99°7′57.17″W
- Type: History museum
- Director: José María Espinasa Yllades
- Architect: Francisco Guerrero y Torres
- Owner: Mexico City government
- Public transit access: Zócalo/Tenochtitlan metro station, Sistema de Transporte Colectivo
- Website: www.cultura.cdmx.gob.mx/recintos/mcm/

The Museum of Mexico City (Spanish: Museo de la Ciudad de Mexico) is located at Pino Suarez 30, a few blocks south of the Zocalo, on what was the Iztapalapa Causeway, near where Hernán Cortés and Moctezuma II met for the first time. This building used to be the palace of the Counts of Santiago de Calimaya, who were the descendants of one of the conquistadors with Cortés. The house was extensively remodeled during the colony to much the appearance that it has today and remained in the family until 1960, when the Mexico City government acquired it from them in order to found the Museum that is found there today. The museum contains a number of elements of the old palace as well as 26 rooms dedicated to the history and development of Mexico City from Aztec times to the present. It also contains a library and the studios of painter Joaquín Clausell, who lived here in the late 19th and early 20th centuries.

The building was completed in 1779 and the descendants of the counts lived in it until 1960. The architect that completed the palace was Francisco Antonio de Guerrero y Torres.

== History of the Palace of the Counts of Santiago de Calimaya ==
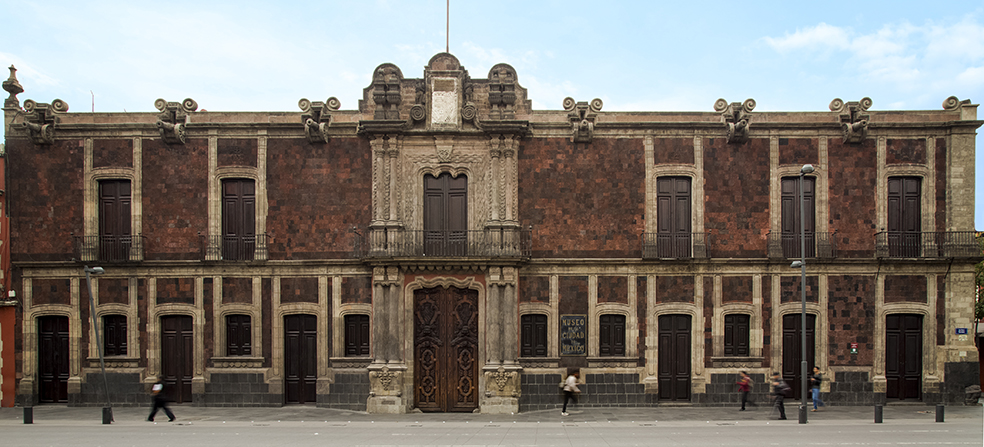
Mexico City Museum facade

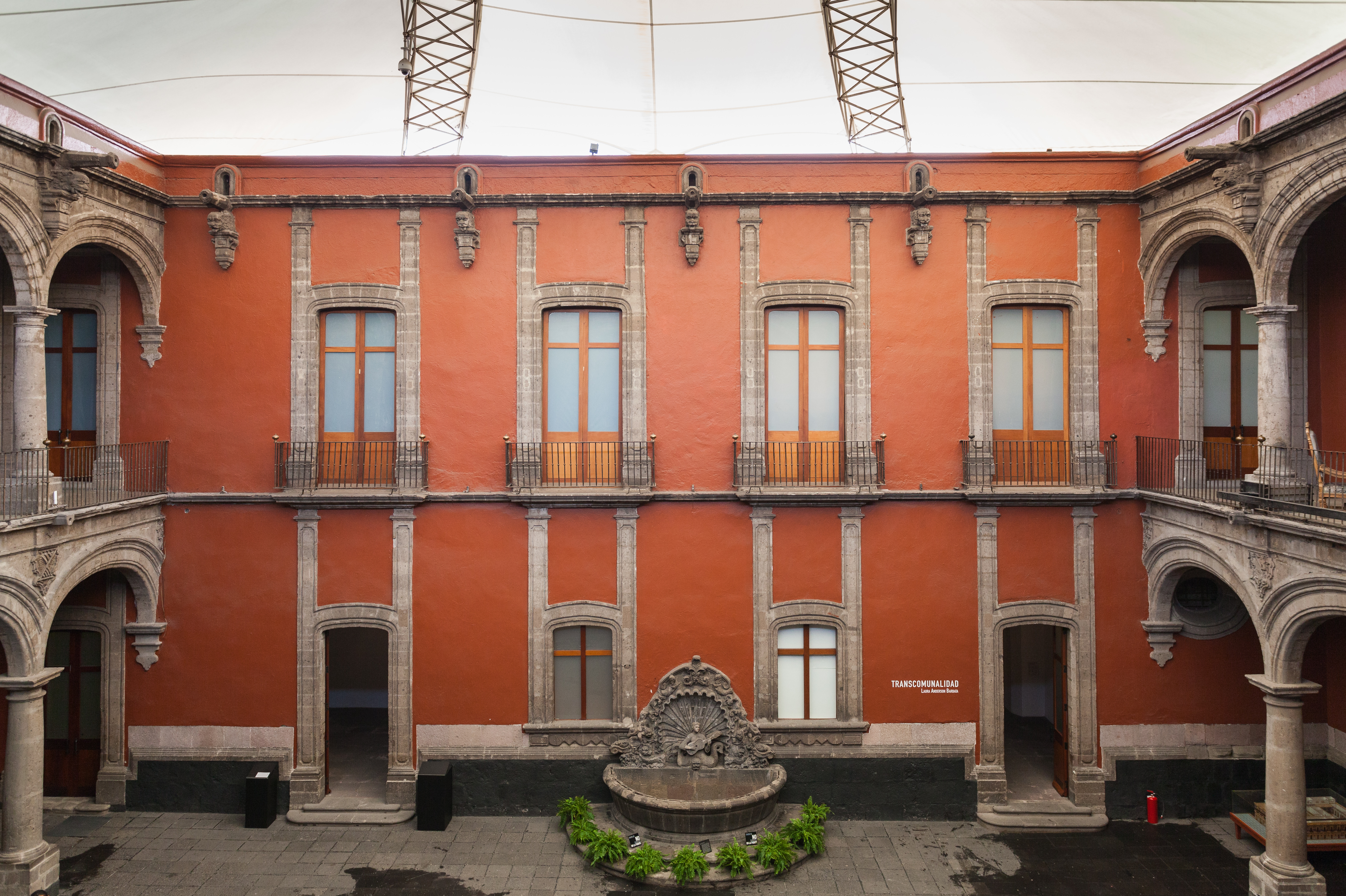
Frontal view of the courtyard.

The history of the Old Palace of the Counts of Santiago de Calimaya dates back to the year 1527, when Mr. Juan Gutiérrez Altamirano arrived in New Spain from the island of Cuba, where he had been governor in 1524; to take the post of Corregidor of Texcoco and overseer of Hernán Cortés.

When Hernán Cortés distributed the lands closest to the Templo Mayor Mexica among his comrades-in-arms and closest collaborators; He gives the land located on what was then calle de Ixtapalapa to the corner of the street that goes to the Hospital de Nuestra Señora de la Concepción to Don Juan Gutiérrez Altamirano, who shortly before had married Juana Altamirano Pizarro, first cousin of the conqueror. In this period, according to some plans, the house belonged to the “fortress-house” architectural typology, that is, a house with defensive elements against adverse situations. The description of the first dwelling house built by order of Lic. Altamirano corresponded to a rectangular building with the appearance of a three-story feudal tower with a door on the ground floor, four windows on the middle floor and six windows on the top floor. plus. The entire building had a conical roof and a tower on one side.

It was not until the third generation that the family was awarded the first noble title: “Counts of Santiago de Calimaya”; of Santiago because they were devoted to St. James the Great, the Spanish patron saint; of Calimaya because that was the name of the town that was given to them in Encomienda and that generated great wealth for them. The title of count was granted to Don Fernando Altamirano y Velasco, a direct descendant of Juan Gutiérrez Altamirano, in turn married María de Velasco e Ibarra, granddaughter of Viceroy Luis de Velasco. Fernando Altamirano received the royal grant from Philip III of Spain in which he was granted the title of Count of Santiago de Calimaya in 1616, and which was used for fourteen generations.

A time of economic and social boom came for the Altamirano Velasco family. The remodeling of the old manor house in which his predecessors had lived, was in charge of the seventh count, since the building was badly damaged by earthquakes and floods, and more than remodeling, it was a complete restructuring, because the old building was demolished. This new construction is related to the promulgation of the Bourbon reforms in New Spain. These reforms meant that despite the fact that the counts maintained a status as nobles, many of their properties would be seized by the Crown. The counts suffered financial difficulties at this time, but their status as nobles enabled them to get the audiencia to allow them to tax their lands, so that they would obtain money for the rebuilding of their palace.

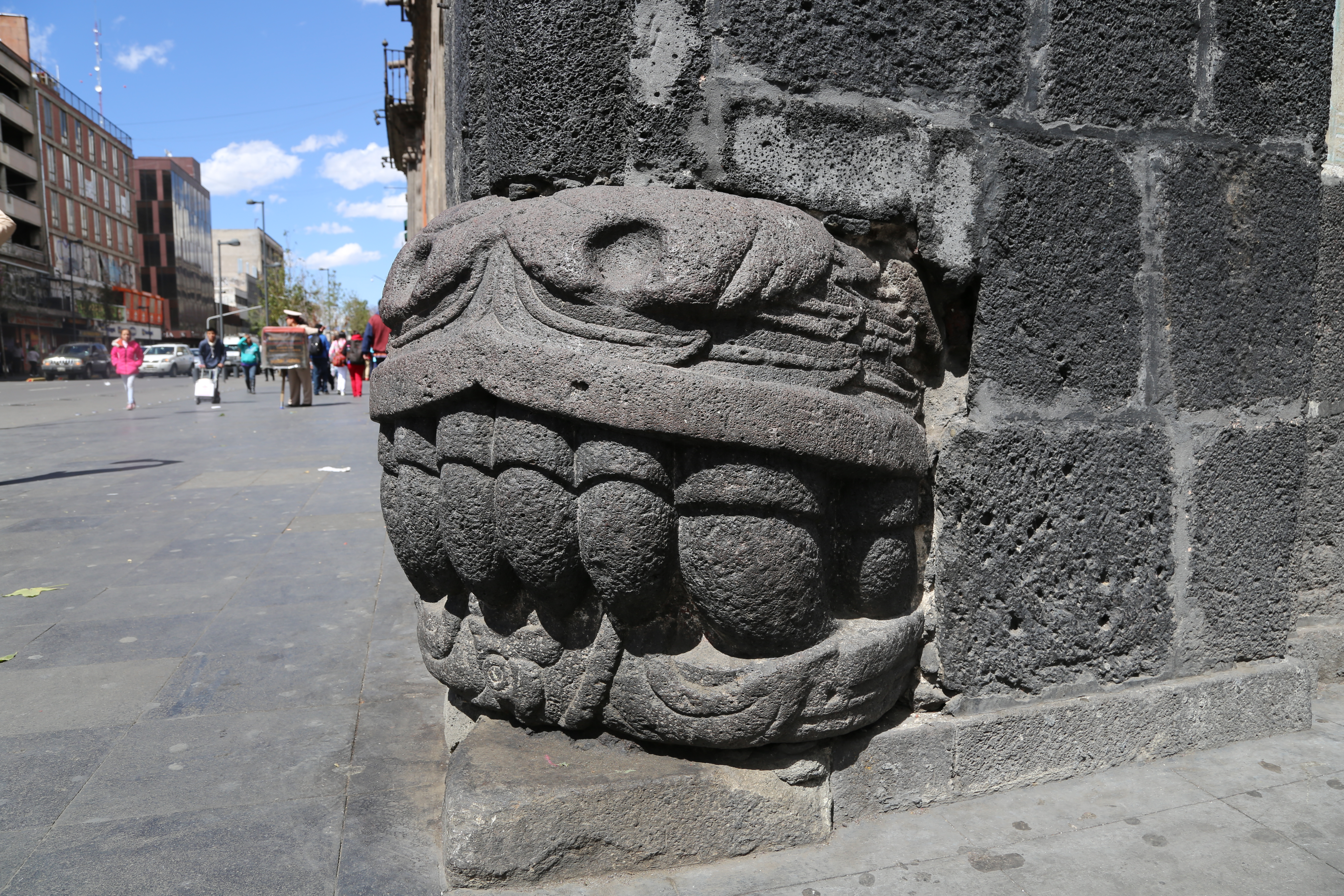
Quetzalcoatl head on the corner of the building.

The palace was rebuilt at the end of the 18th century, carrying out the work between 1776 and 1779 by the Criollo builder Francisco Antonio de Guerrero y Torres, author of other works of great importance such as the Palace of the Marquises of Jaral del Berrio and the Capilla del Pocito. In the colonial era, calle de Pino Suárez (at that time, Iztapalapa road) was the fashionable street for the houses of the nobility, which were thus aligned with the Royal Palace. The facade of the palace was covered with tezontle and the portal and the windows with quarry.

At this time, the viceregal government decided to renovate the deteriorated palace in 1777, giving the work to Francisco Antonio Guerrero y Torres, putting a lien on the building's rental income. The Aztec serpent's head that serves and the building's impressive cornerstone was probably uncovered during these renovations. Cost of remodeling the house was 130,000 pesos. During this time, the palace chapel was added, built between 1778 and 1779. At that time, it was common to attend Mass everyday but at the same time upper-class women were generally not permitted to walk on the streets to go to church. Many large mansions and palaces, therefore, had their own chapels with their own sacristies. These families would have private Masses said in their homes.

The house was inhabited by the family until 1964, which is an exceptional case, it was the only manor house occupied by a New Spanish noble family until the middle of the 20th century, when it was expropriated, the Cervantes family was forced to sell it to the government of Mexico City, which arranged for the foundation of the museum in the house.

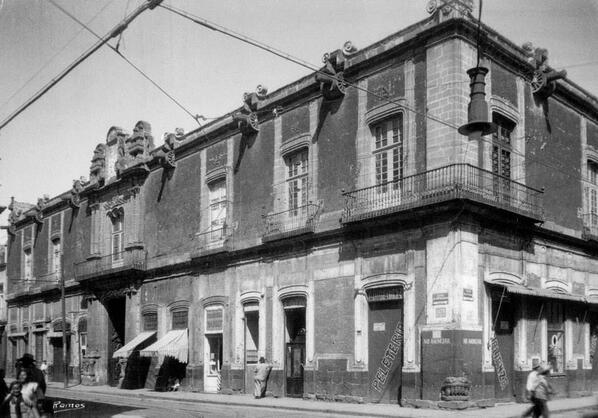
Palace of the Counts of Calimaya in 1920.

== Description of the palace ==
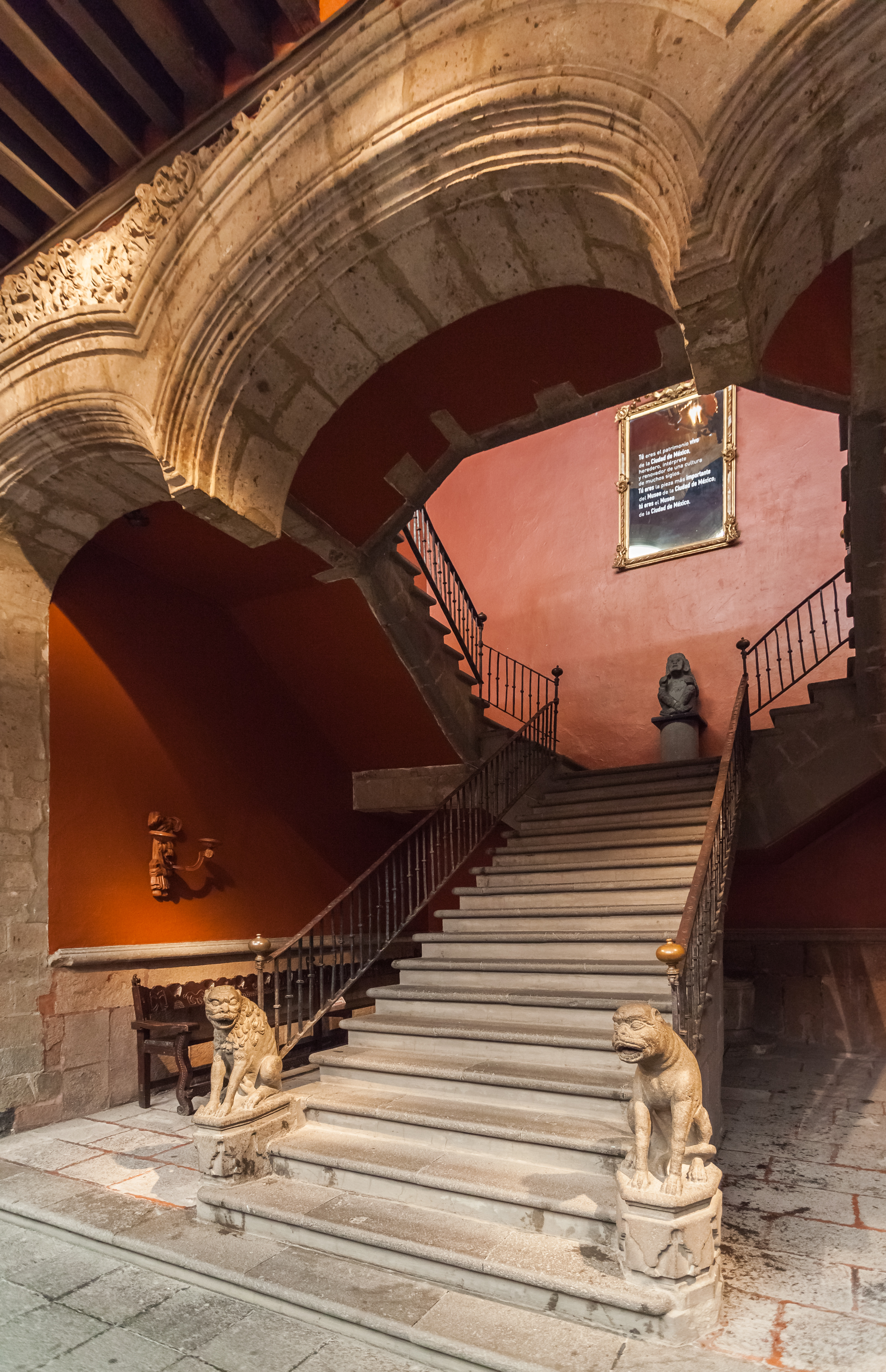
Stairway (sideways)

During the colonial period, this palace was considered one of the most sumptuous in New Spain. The structure covers 2,762 m2, has a masonry foundation, thick masonry walls, and the facade covered in tezontle. The main entrance and portal are done in cantera, a grayish-white stone, as well as the central balcony. There are also friezes on the facade done in basalt. The Baroque portal rests on four clawed feet and mascarons. It also has cannon-shaped gargoyles, which could be fired, but only with permission of city authorities. The look that survives today is the result of remodeling work done in the late 18th century and was one of the last major Baroque projects in Mexico. One of the building's most distinctive elements is the previously mentioned Aztec serpent's head, which was probably uncovered during this work. It is thought that the head may have come from the Templo Mayor and was placed as the cornerstone of the original house that was owned by Juan Gutierrez Altamirano.

Inside, the house has two floors with two courtyards, which was common with houses of Mexican nobility. The family's coat-of-arms adorn the arches of the main courtyard. One distinctive element of the palace is the fountain in the shape of a shell located in the main courtyard. Its deteriorated condition and the fact that there is little space between it and the windows near it suggest that it dates back to before the 18th-century remodeling. The focus of the fountain is a Nereid playing a guitar. It is possible that the marine motif refers to the sea voyages the Counts made to places like the Philippines.

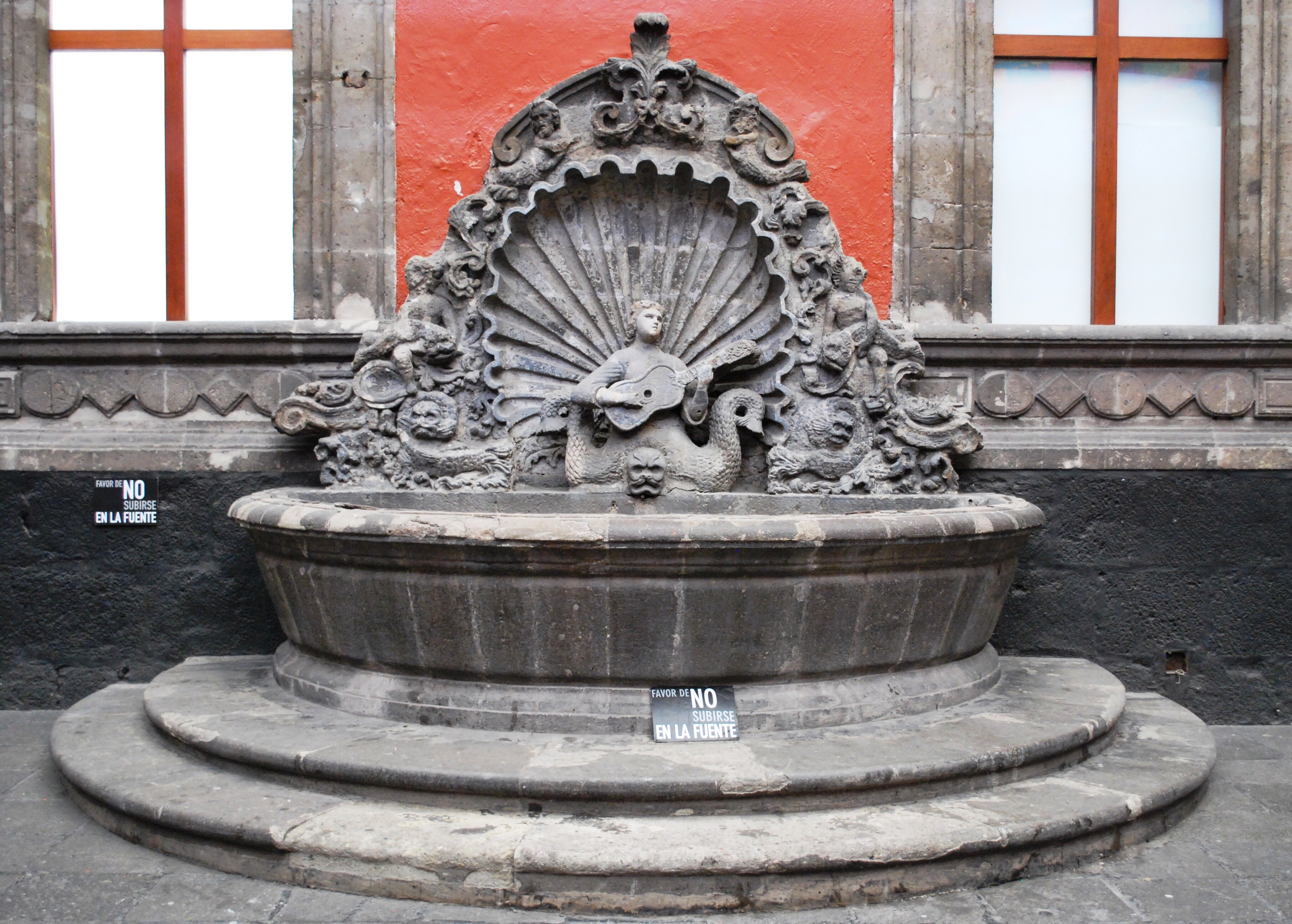
Colonial fountain in the palace

The house had its own chapel, but only fragments of the facade remain in the structure today. One room that survives nearly intact is the music room. In the 19th century, music was one of the activities that the upper-class engaged in on a daily basis. European composers such as Franz Schubert, Chopin, Beethoven and Liszt were preferred but music by Mexican composers such as Tomás León, Aniceto Ortega and Melesio Morales could be played as well. Music rooms were considered important during that time period to show the culture of the family. The main stairwell is located in the main courtyard opposite the nereid fountain. The dogs that adorn the banister of the main stairwell and the mascarons over the main doorway have an Oriental look to them, which was not common in such residences. Partly because of this, it has been speculated that the wood and the labor used to create parts of the house were of Philippine origin. However, both the work and the wood are native to Mexico, although the wood is not very common.

== Museum of Mexico City ==
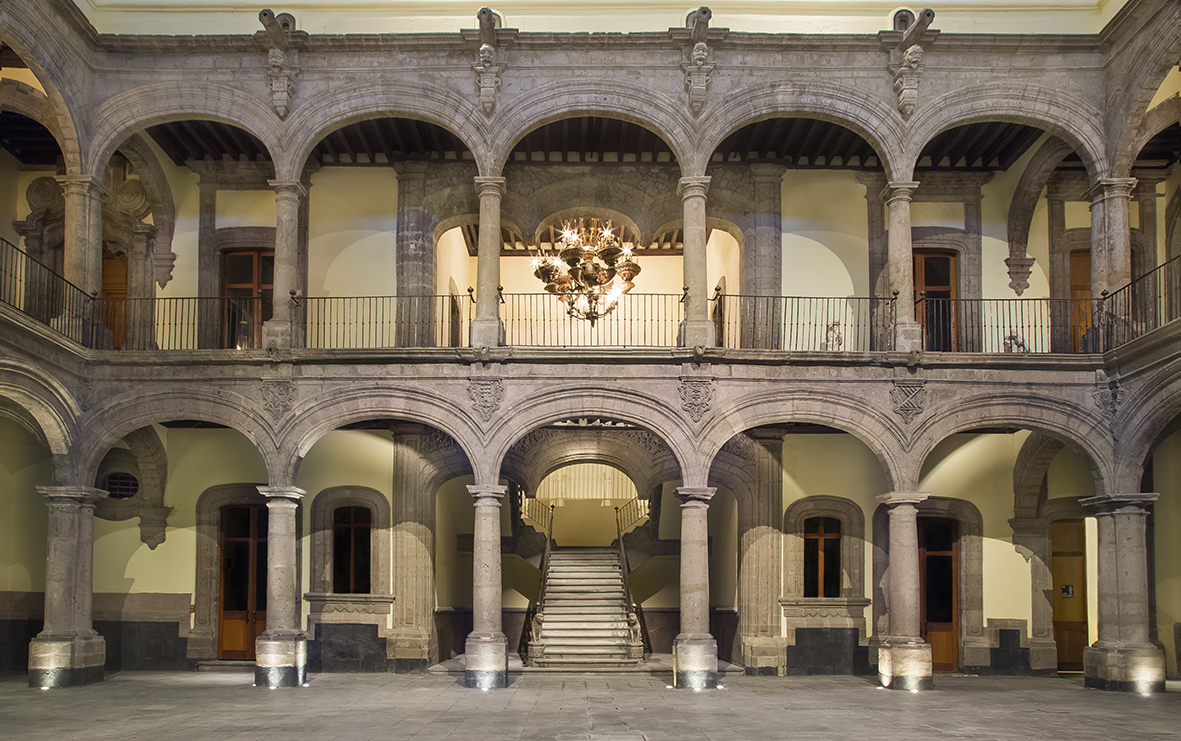
Cloister of the museum palace

From the end of the 19th century and through most of the 20th century, this part of Mexico City suffered a severe decline. This house was adapted to rent space to lower-class tenants and by end of the 1950s had become tenements, in spite of the fact that it had been declared a national monument in 1931. In 1960, the Mexico City government acquired the building from the descendants of the Counts of Santiago de Calimaya in 1960. The City decided to convert this building into a museum. It hired architect Pedro Ramírez Vázquez to remodel it, converting the old rooms into exhibition halls. In 1964, the Museum of Mexico City was inaugurated, focusing on what Mexico City was and what Mexico City hoped to be. However, by 1992, the Museum was in disarray. The museum closed and there were plans to convert it into lodging for guests of the city, but this never came to pass. In 1997, the Museum was reorganized and reopened dedicated to exhibitions about Mexico City's past, present and future, working in cooperation with the Museo Nacional de Antropología, the Museo de Arte Moderno the Museo de Virreinato and the Museo del Caracol.

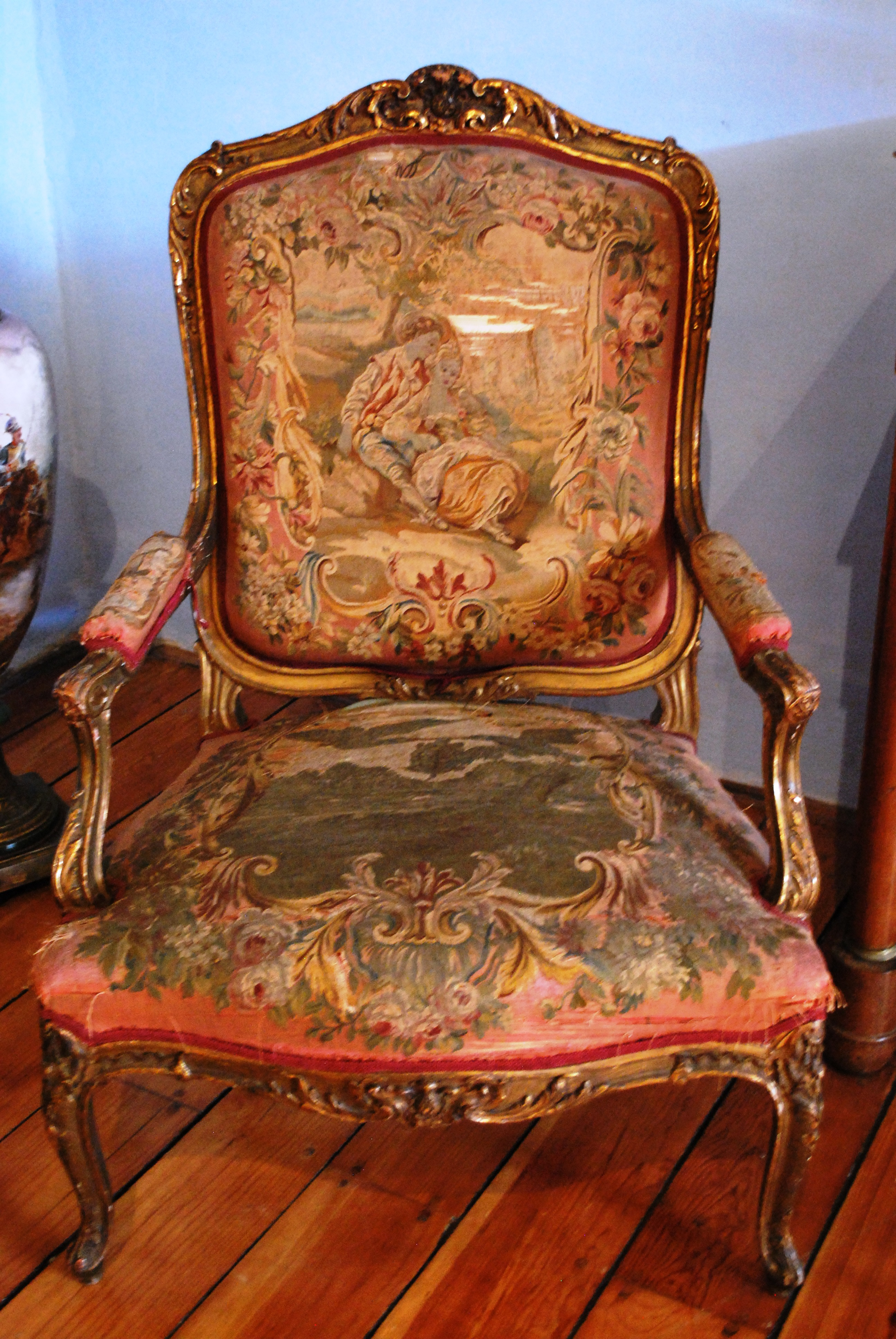
19th century Romance style chair in the music room

It has 26 rooms covering the evolution of Mexico City from Aztec times to the present. The permanent collection is divided into the following periods of time: the pre-Hispanic period, the colonial period (16th to 18th century), the 19th century and the 20th century. The pre-Hispanic room, decorated by the painter Ana Ugalde and others, contains objects such as metates (flat stones for grinding corn), jars, bowls, urns, incense burners as well as Aztec codices, maps and other objects showing the everyday life of people in the Mexican highlands of this time period. The colonial-era, 19th and 20th century rooms also contain everyday items from these time periods such as furniture, desks, tables, vases, and jars as well as arts such as sculptures and paintings.

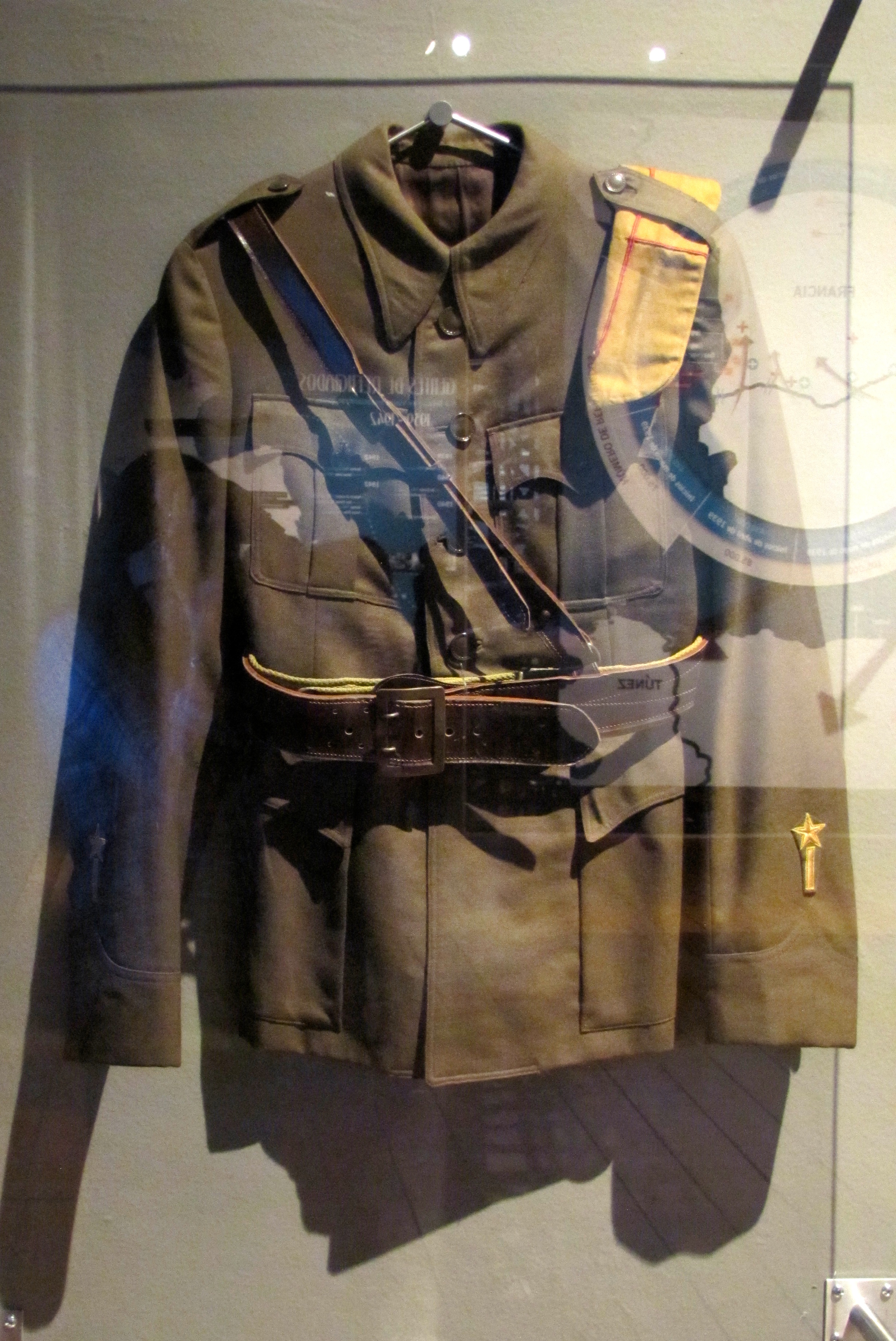
Exhibition of the Spanish republicans exile from the Franco government who arrived in Mexico

The studio of Campeche painter Joaquín Clausell occupies several rooms in the upper part of the house. He lived there as the husband of Angela Cervantes, a descendant of the Counts of Santiago de Calimaya. Clausell received visitors in these rooms such as Gerardo Murillo (Dr. Atl), Diego Rivera, Carlos Pellicer, Salvador Novo and Julio Ruelas. The rooms contain 1,300 sketches by the artist including portraits of famous people, images of Christ, angels and animals and mythological scenes. These works show influences from the Impressionism and Symbolism movements. The collection of works by Clausell include foreshortened figures that the artist made simply to clean his brushes. Clausell's works are on display here due to an agreement between the Museum and the Museo Nacional de Arte, where every two months, works by this artists are circulated between the two museums.

The Jaime Torres Bodet Library contains approximately 10,000 volumes, mostly dealing with topics related to Mexico City. Its collection came from several sources including the 19th century newspaper collection, maps of the city from the city council reserve as well as original copies of laws passed by the city council. It also contains a large collection of books about the history of the city.

There are also temporary exhibits, educational programs for children and adults, a room devoted to the river system in the Valley of Mexico, a bookstore, and guided tours. One of the events recently held here was called "Beats & Bits," which traced the origins of electronic music from the beginnings of the 20th century to the present. Another event was an exposition of Mexican wrestling (lucha libre) featuring photographs, costumes and other objects related to this spectacle.

In 1999, then-mayor of Mexico City, Cuauhtémoc Cárdenas Solórzano, gave the keys of the city to Pope John Paul II here.
