= CutOut Fest =

Internaonal animation and digital arts festival

CutOut Fest is an international animation and digital arts festival held every November in Querétaro, México. The festival previews short-form animated works, including narrative films, experimental films, advertising spots, title sequences, music videos and GIFs. CutOut Fest is Mexico's largest festival celebrating non-traditional filmmaking. Besides the main competition, the festival includes other events in the program like artist panels, workshops, and installations. The festival's "objective is to promote the development of the animation and digital arts industries in Mexico as a free forum for international dissemination" The logo of the festival is the View Master and the tagline is "new ways to see". The admission to the entire festival is free of cost as long as the attendee registers beforehand. The main sponsors of the festival are government agencies that promote cultural activities in Mexico including Querétaro Esta En Nostros, Secretaria de Cultural, Museo de La Ciudad, and Cineteca Rosalio Solana.

== History ==
CutOut Fest was founded in 2009, and held 12 - 14 November 2009 as a CutOut Fest International Animated Short Film by Bianca Peregrina and Miguel del Moral. Since then, the festival has evolved into "International Festival of Animation and Digital Arts".

In 2014, the festival entered the Network of Latin American Animation Festivals, which provides the festival with access to Latin American animators and animation studios, many of whom have been invited to speak at artist panels and participate in the festival as a jury member.

== Programs ==
An annual CutOut Fest festival generally has four days of programming. Each day consists of screenings of the official selections to the festival's main competition categories. At the same time, there are artist panels, installations, VR experiences, freeplay areas, and live performances happening at other theater venues. The VR experiences and freeplay areas are part of the CutOut Fest Interactive that exhibit interactive stories and games that attendees can participate in.

Separate from the festival events is the Living Market in which the primary purpose is to create an opportunity for animators and industry people to network. It has a variety of workshops related to building animation techniques as well as workshops on navigating the job market.

CutOut Fest also has a YouTube channel called CutOut TV that posts teasers about the upcoming festival and recaps of past events.

== Awards ==
There are two awards given for the main competition categories of Best Narrative Short Film and Best Student Film. One film is selected as the overall winner and one Mexican film is selected as the winner of the Mexican version of the same award. Best Narrative Short Film also grants several Special Mention awards. The other awards include Best Experimental Short Film, Best Music Video, Best Title Sequence, and Best Advertising Spot.
