= Tlaxcala House, Mexico City =

Coordinates: 19°26′11.24″N 99°7′49.83″W

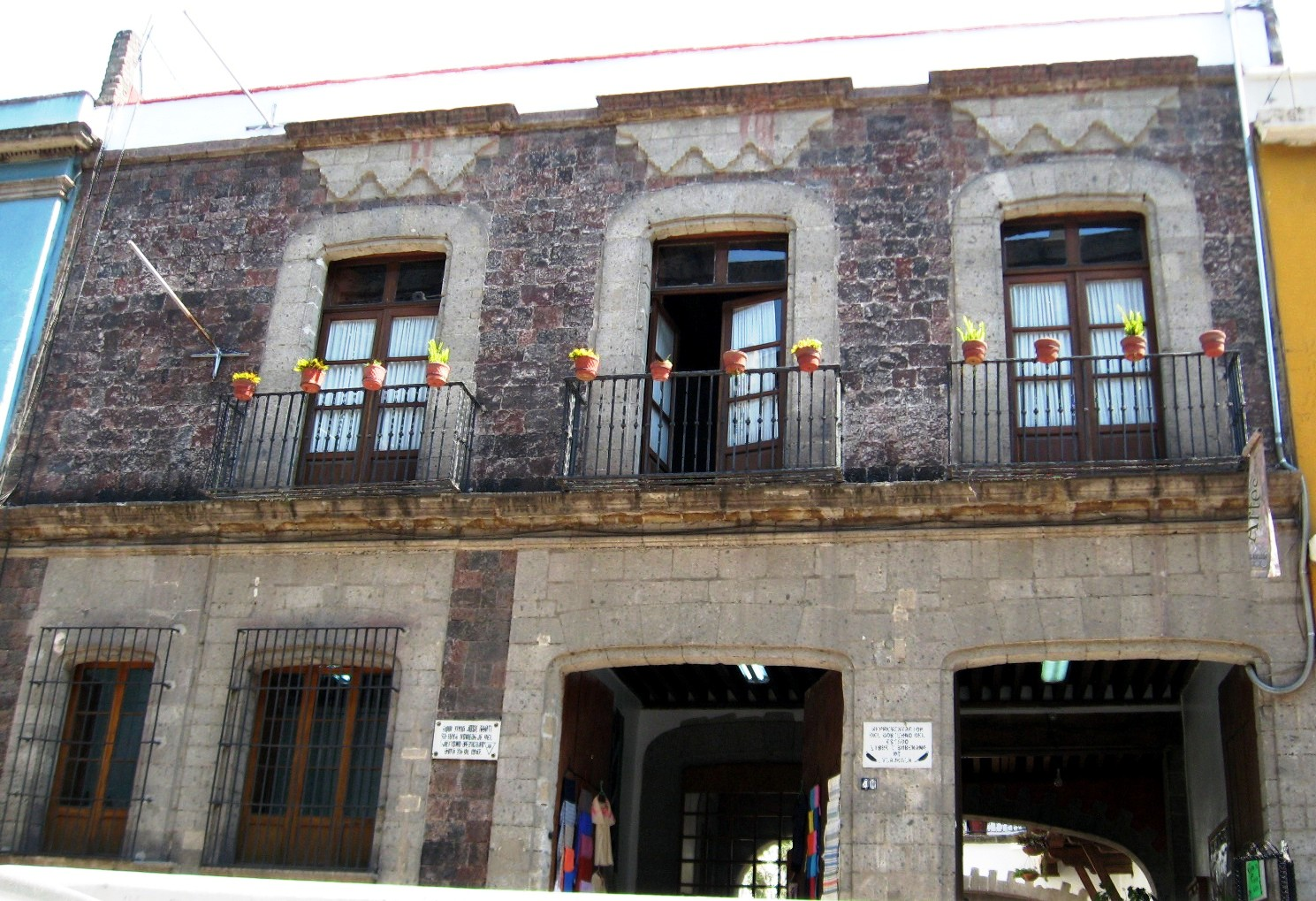
Facade of the house

The Tlaxcala House is located at 40 San Ildefonso Street in the historic center of Mexico City. It is an example of a typical middle-class home of the 18th century, meant that its style is somewhere between the mansions of the wealthy and the houses of the commoners of the time.

The outer facade has two levels, with most of the surface covered in tezontle, a blood-red volcanic stone, with chiluca, a grayish white stone, to frame windows and doors. In the lower part of the facade, the shutters covering the windows reach to the cornice. The main doorway leads to an entrance hall which leads to the inner patio. However, only three of the four sides have corridors and rooms. The fourth side is simple a wall. The north and south corridors have arches, and the north corridor has a ceiling with heavy beams. The stairway to the upper floor is illuminated by an octagonal skylight.

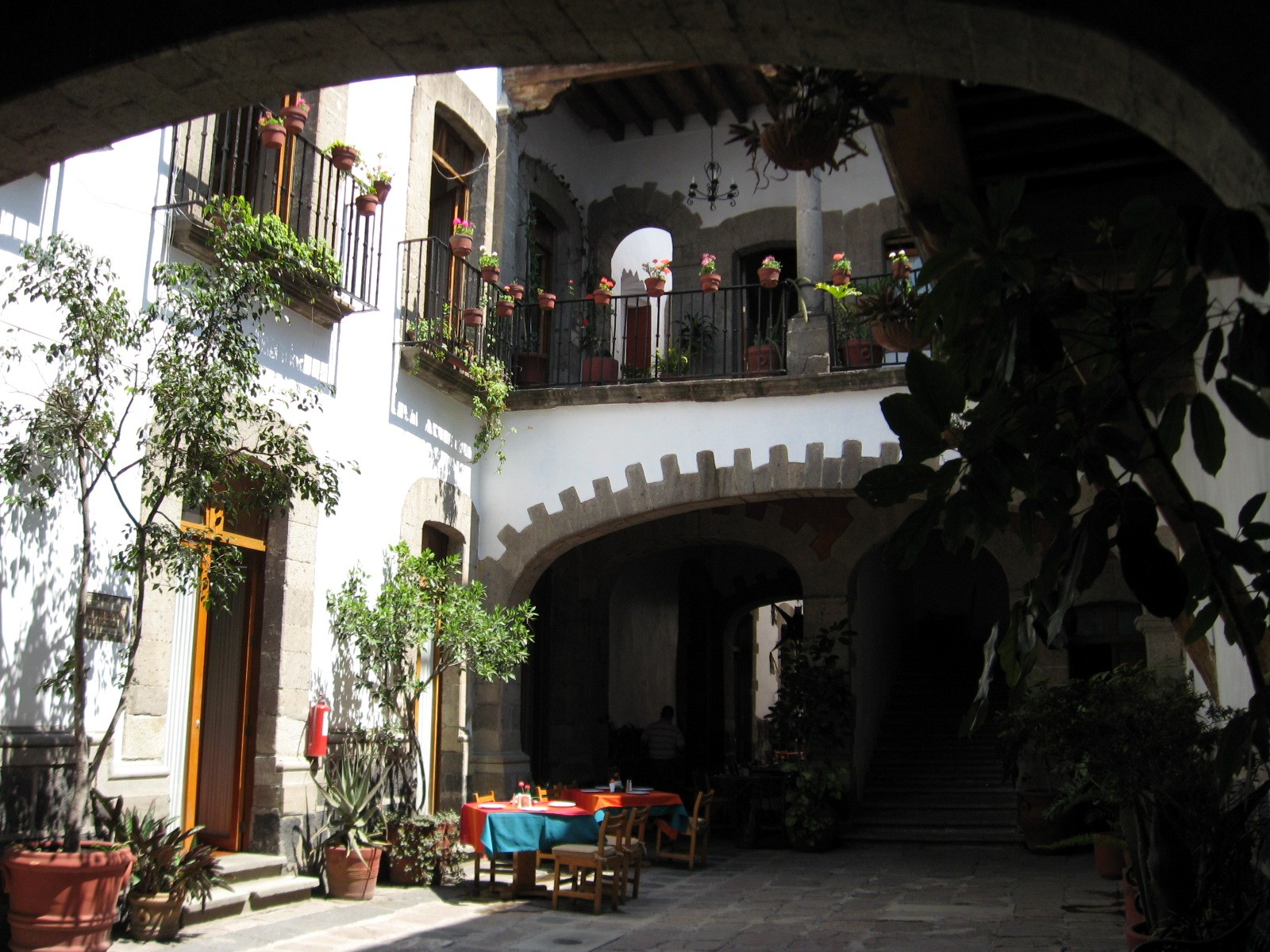
Interior patio

Writer Jose Marti lived in this house near the end of the 19th century, and a plaque at the building's entrance attests to this. The house now is the home of the Tlaxcala State delegation to the federal government in Mexico City.
