= La Enseñanza Church =

Coordinates: 19°26′9.95″N 99°7′56.01″W

- Iglesia de Nuestra Señora del Pilar
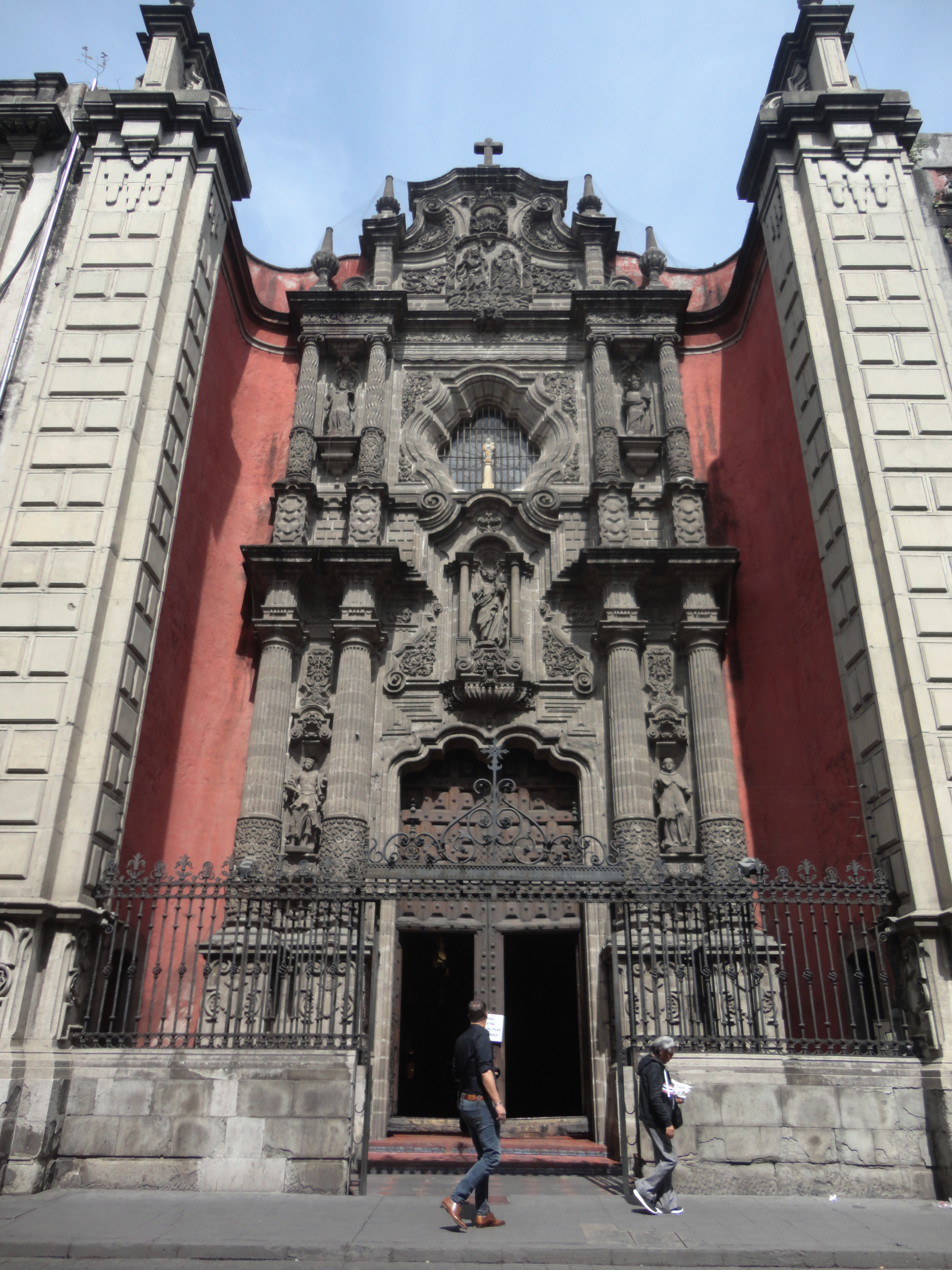
- Main portal of the church
- La Enseñanza Church
- Address: 104 Donceles Street, Mexico City
- Country: Mexico
- Denomination: Catholic

History
- Founder: Mother Maria Ignacia Alzor
- Consecrated: 1778

Architecture
- Architectural type: Mexican Churrigueresque, Baroque

La Enseñanza Church (The Teaching Church) (1772-1778) is located on 104 Donceles Street in the historic center of Mexico City. The Mexican Churrigueresque style of this church, especially that of its altarpieces, is upheld as the pinnacle of the Baroque period in Mexico, as this style soon gave way to the Neoclassic shortly after this church was built. The church’s official name is Iglesia de Nuestra Señora del Pilar (Church of Our Lady of the Pillar). The former convent was called El Convento de la Enseñanza La Antigua (The Old Convent of the Teaching), from which is derived the church’s popular name. After the Reform War, the convent was disbanded. The complex has had various uses, but the church has been returned to its sacred function.

== History ==
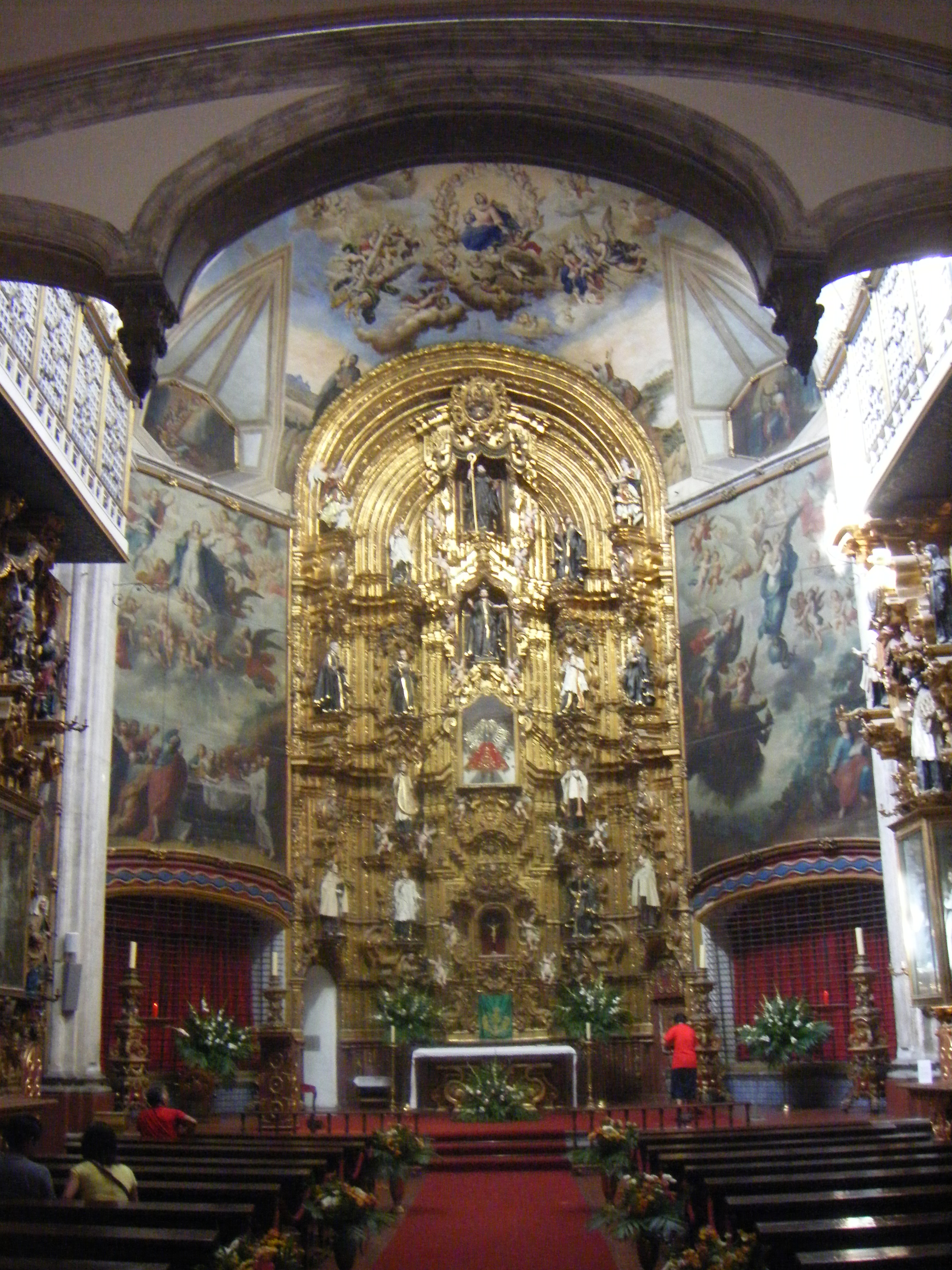
Main altar

The convent was founded by Mother Maria Ignacia Alzor, who belonged to the Company of Mary Our Lady founded by Jeanne de Lestonnac, one of two convents of that order in Mexico City. Mother Maria Ignacia was from a wealthy Criollo family that had established itself in Coahuila, Chihuahua and Durango. Maria Ignacio was the daughter of José Ramón de Azlor, espaňol, and Captain General of Coahuila-Tejas. Her mother was Maria Ignacia Javiera de Echeverz y Valdes, the 2nd Marquesa de Aguayo. Maria Ignacio was born in 1715 in Durango and died in 1777. She entered the order of the Company of Mary Our Lady in Spain, where she obtained permission to found a convent and school for young girls. She bought two houses on what is now Donceles Street (then Calle de Cordobanes), just north of the main cathedral of Mexico City. In the area between the two houses, she began to build the church. This small space would determine the unusual design and dimensions of the building. With Francisco Antonio Guerrero y Torres and Friar Lucas de Jesús María as the architects, the church was built between 1772 and 1778.

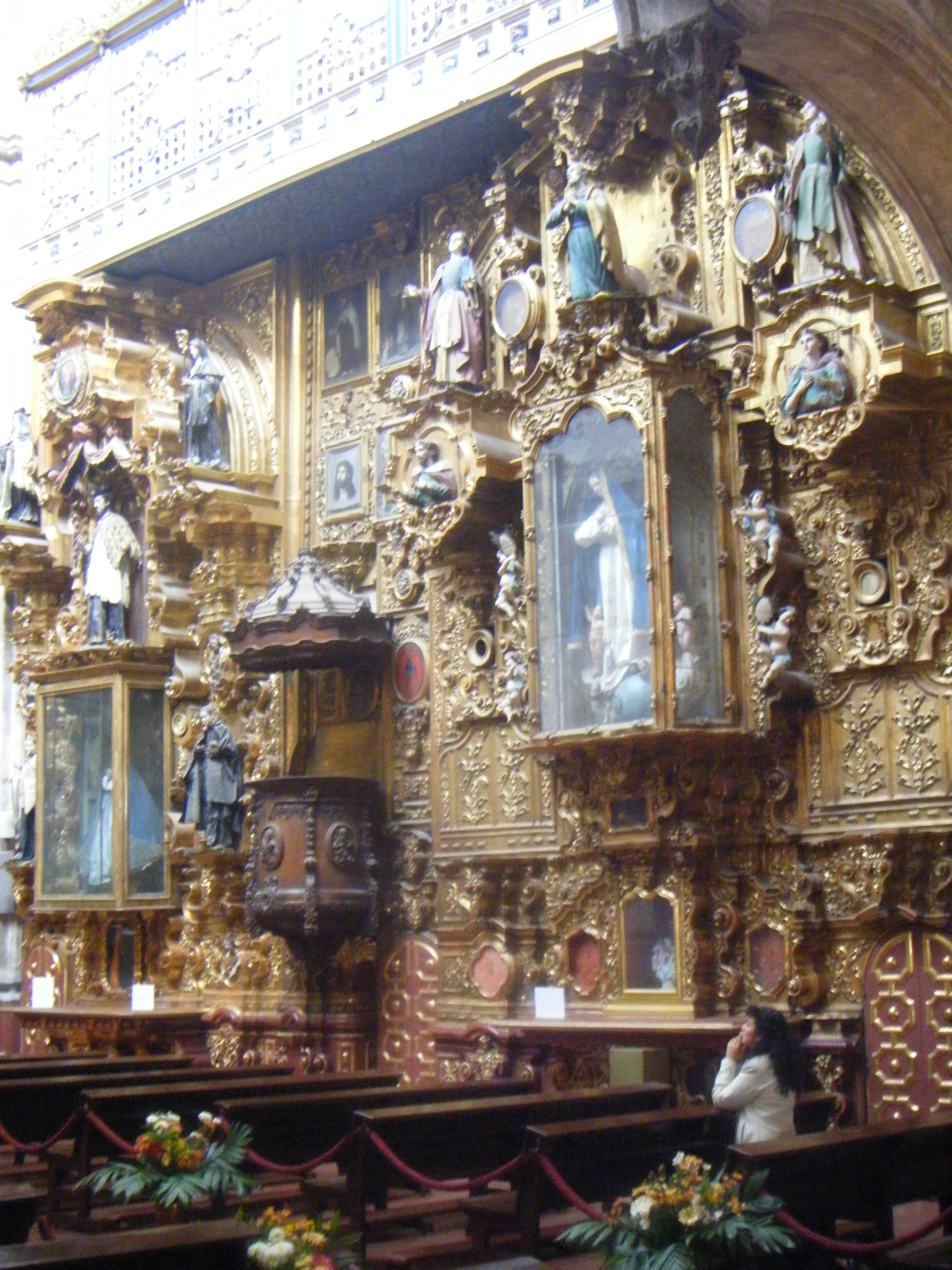
Altarpieces at the side of the main nave.

The church was consecrated in 1778 with Our Lady of the Pillar and Saint John of Nepomuk as patrons by the Archbishop of Mexico, Alonso Núñez de Haro y Peralta. The relics used to consecrate the church included a fingerbone from Saint John, a 25 cm gold statue of him, as well as a shroud that had been in contact with the Shroud of Turin. A wooden statue of Our Lady of the Pillar, which was inherited by Mother Maria Ignacia from her mother, was placed on the main altar.

The name La Enseñanza comes from one of the convent’s main missions, which was to educate young girls. Over time, the convent school gained status until the most-privileged of New Spain’s families sent their daughters there. It also taught girls from humbler families, especially in fine needlework.

When Mother Maria Ignacia died in 1767, she was interred in the communion altar of the church. After the Reform War in 1867, the convent was closed and initially converted into a prison. Later, the convent was used to house the Palace of Justice, the General Notary Archive, and the offices of the Ministry of Education. The church building was declared a national monument on 9 February 1931. The church building was refurbished between 1963 and 1969, reopening to worship in 1974. Since 1984, this church has been in the custody of Order of the Missionaries of the Eucharist of Nazareth, who give services and maintain the building.

== Description ==
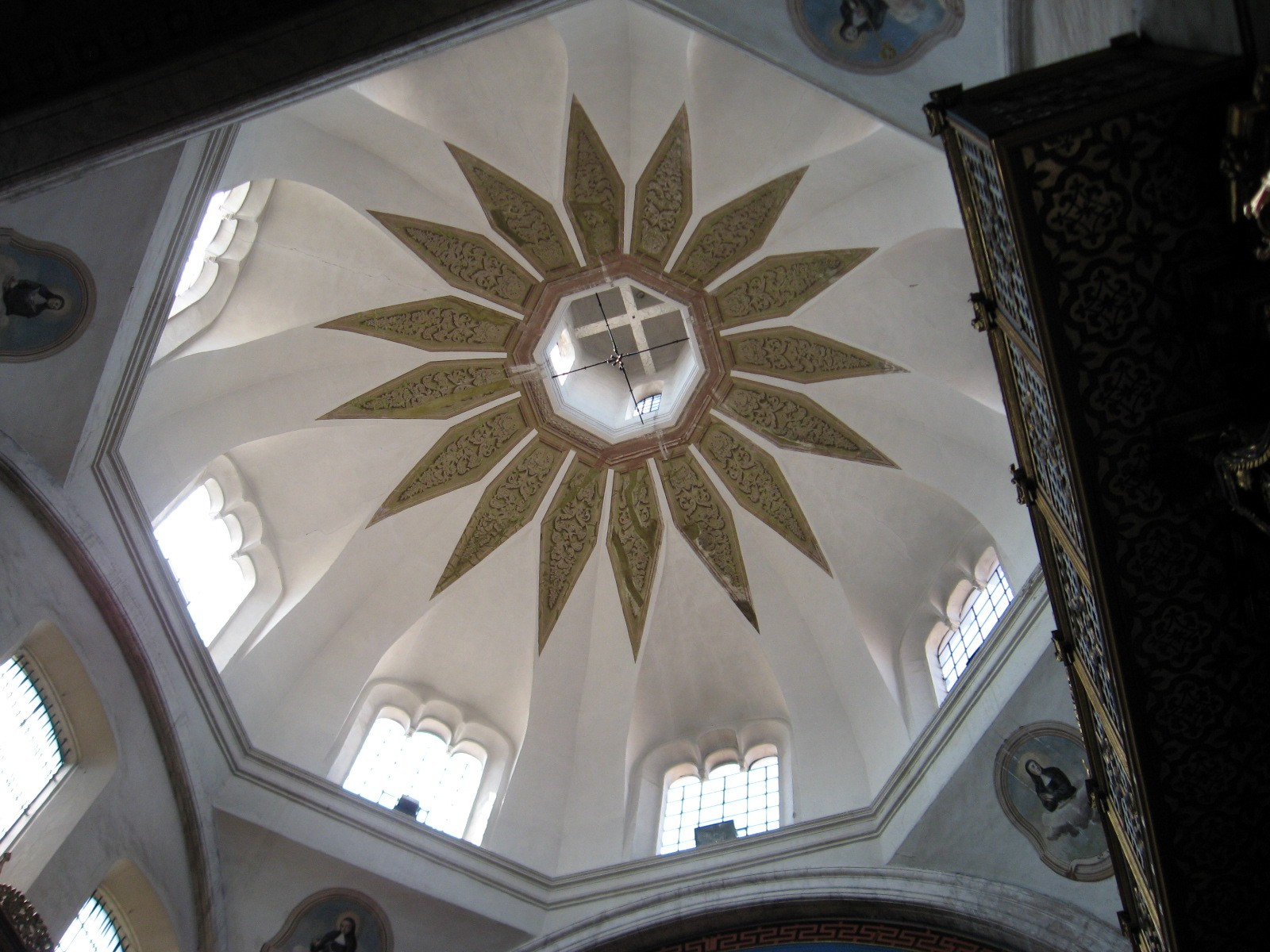
Vault of the dome

It is a small church with its main axis running transversally to the street. The currently visible facade of the church was built in 1912, as a reproduction of the original. Unlike most other convent churches, La Enseñanza has only one, rather than two, portals. At the bottom, or first body, of the portal are the church’s main doors, which are topped by a curved arch, a common Baroque feature. Above this arch is an elongated niche. The doors are flanked by four relatively unadorned, thick columns. Between these columns are statues of the Archangel Michael and John de Nepomuk. The first is the guardian angel of the convent and the second is one of its patrons. Above the doorway arch and between the first and second bodies of the portal is an elongated niche that serves as a dividing line between the two bodies.(historic)

Above these four thick columns are four more slender columns decorated with geometric figures and zig-zagging grooves. Between these columns are statues of Saint Benedict and Ignatius of Loyola, whose doctrines are important to this order. On the same level is a window for light, which is surrounded by moldings placed one behind the other for an echo-like effect. Within the moldings and in front of the window is a small, slender figure of Our Lady of the Pillar. Above this is the crest, which is triangular in shape and bears images of God the Father, God the Son and a dove representing the Holy Spirit. Above this is an acanthus leaf supporting a crown.

The interior is of the ultra-Baroque, or Mexican Churrigueresque style. It uses natural light to highlight the golden details of the altarpieces. The floorplan of the church is an irregular octagon with a long lower choir which houses four altarpieces, and a very small atrium, which once divided the church from the convent/school area.

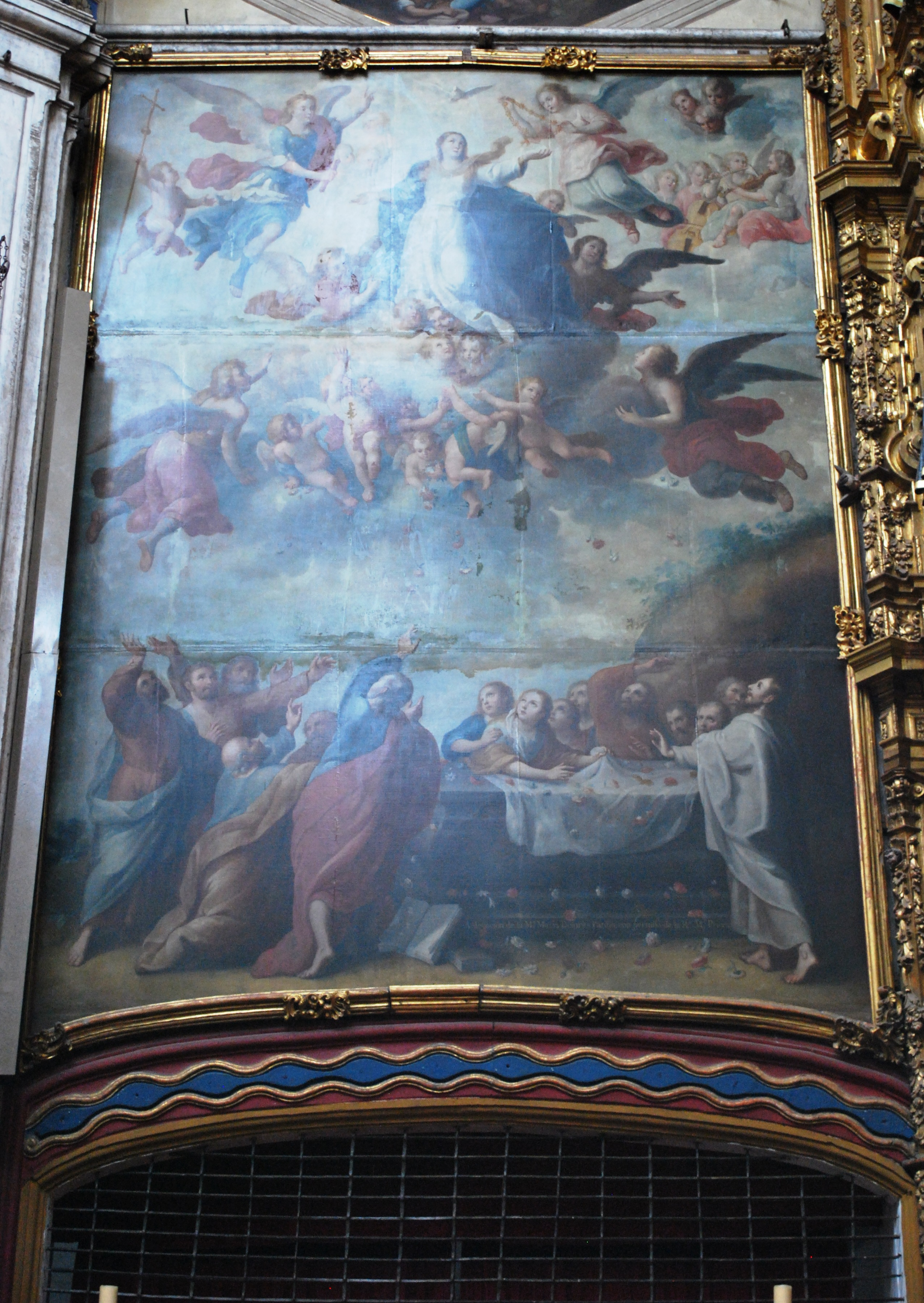
Close up of "The Assumption of Mary" (1779), Andrés López.

The central focus of the church is its main altar with altarpiece, flanked by two choirs. In the central section of the main altarpiece are images of the Holy Sacrament, the Our Lady of the Pillar, Ignatius of Loyola, and Benedict of Nursia. These sculptures are made from glue-soaked cloth. The church also has six side altarpieces, all of which are done in the 18th-century Mexican Churrigueresque style using estipite (inverted truncated pyramid) columns.

The choirs of the church located on either side of the main altar. This was not the usual place for the choir; normally one choir would be placed above what is the entrance to the church. Since both are in the front of the church, lattice-work screens were placed to shield the nuns from the gaze of commoners during services. Above these choirs, enormous paintings by Andrés López depicting the Assumption of Mary and the Immaculate Conception were installed.

On the right side of the main altar, next to the railing of the choir below, is a small doorway through which the nuns received communion. The frame of this doorway is made of stone and is carved with two mermaids with their tails crossed, supporting an oval with a well, a symbol of wisdom. In the center of the door covering this window is an Eye of Providence surrounded by rays of light and foliage.

The upper choir has an arch with bars decorated with iron foliage, in the center of which is the emblem of the Company of Mary Our Lady. The seats in this choir are the originals as is the organ.

Other features of the church include two windows showing scenes from the Old Testament and an allegorical fresco of the Our Lady of the Pillar covering the vault. The pulpit contains four medallions, each with one of the Four Evangelists. Ten small wooden doors led to confessionals used by the nuns and the students of the convent.
