= Palace of Iturbide =

Former Imperial Palace of Mexico

Coordinates: 19°26′1.55″N 99°8′19.92″W

- Palacio de Iturbide
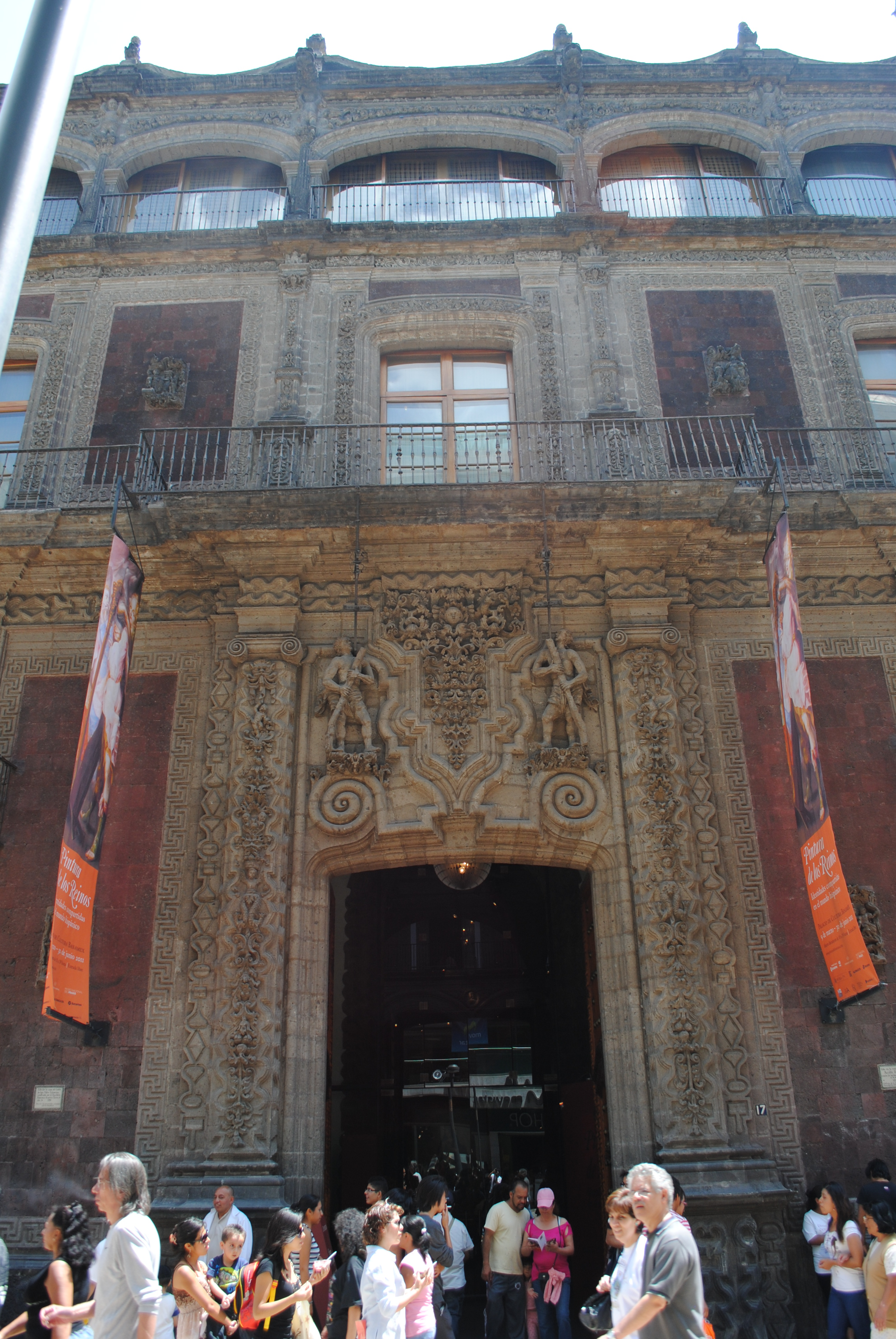
- Facade of Palace of Iturbide
- Alternative names: Palace of the Counts of San Mateo de Valparaiso and Marquises of Jaral de Berio
- Etymology: Agustín de Iturbide

General information
- Architectural style: New Spanish Baroque
- Construction started: 1779
- Completed: 1785

Design and construction
- Architect: Francisco Antonio Guerrero y Torres

The Palace of Iturbide (1779 to 1785) is a large palatial residence located in the historic center of Mexico City at Madero Street #17. It was built by the Count of San Mateo Valparaíso as a wedding gift for his daughter. It gained the name “Palace of Iturbide” because Agustín de Iturbide lived there and accepted the crown of the First Mexican Empire (as Agustin I) at the palace after independence from Spain. Today, the restored building houses the Fomento Cultural Banamex; it has been renamed the Palacio de Cultura Banamex.

== History ==
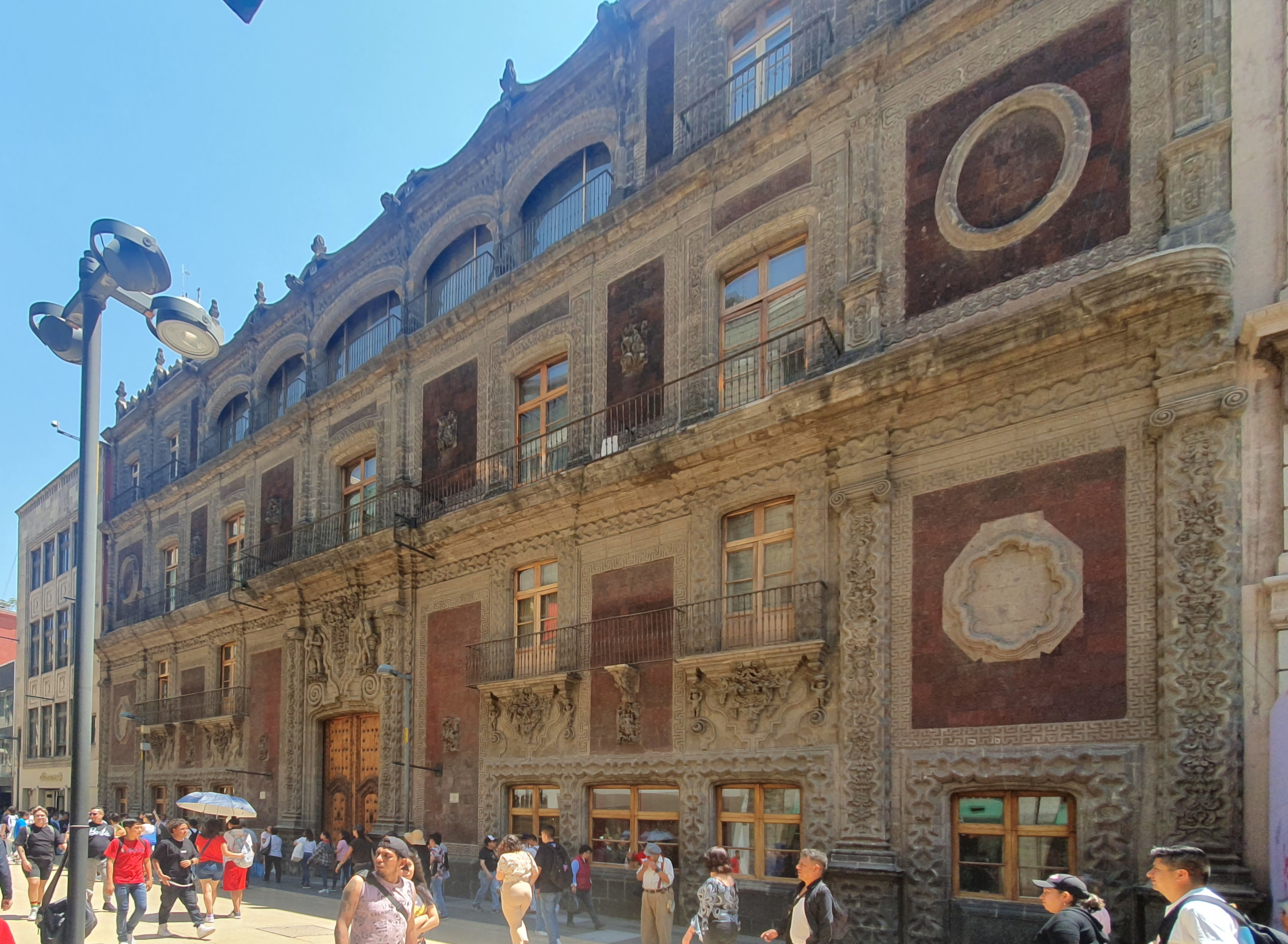
Palace of Iturbide

This residence was constructed by Miguel de Berrio y Saldívar, Count of San Mateo Valparaíso and Marquis of Jaral de Berrio. Berrio y Saldívar's fortune was based in mining and livestock. He also served as the mayor of Mexico City. He purportedly built the palace in an elaborate way to equal the sum of his daughter's dowry, approximately 100,000 pesos, in order to stop his new son-in-law, the Marquis of Moncada of Sicily, from squandering his daughter's wealth. It was built as a replica of the royal palace of Palermo. This couple's son, the grandson of the home's builder, preferred not to live in the palace but offered it for the use of visiting dignitaries, such as viceroy Félix Calleja and later Agustín de Iturbide. From this palace's balcony, Iturbide accepted the offer to be Mexico's first emperor after independence from Spain. During his reign (1821–1823), he lived here, using the house as the royal palace.

After the Conquest, the site had been part of land granted by the Spanish Crown to Gonzalo Juárez de Córdoba. Until the 17th century, the site was a convent for the Sisters of Saint Brigit, until they sold the land to Berrio y Saldívar.

== Design ==
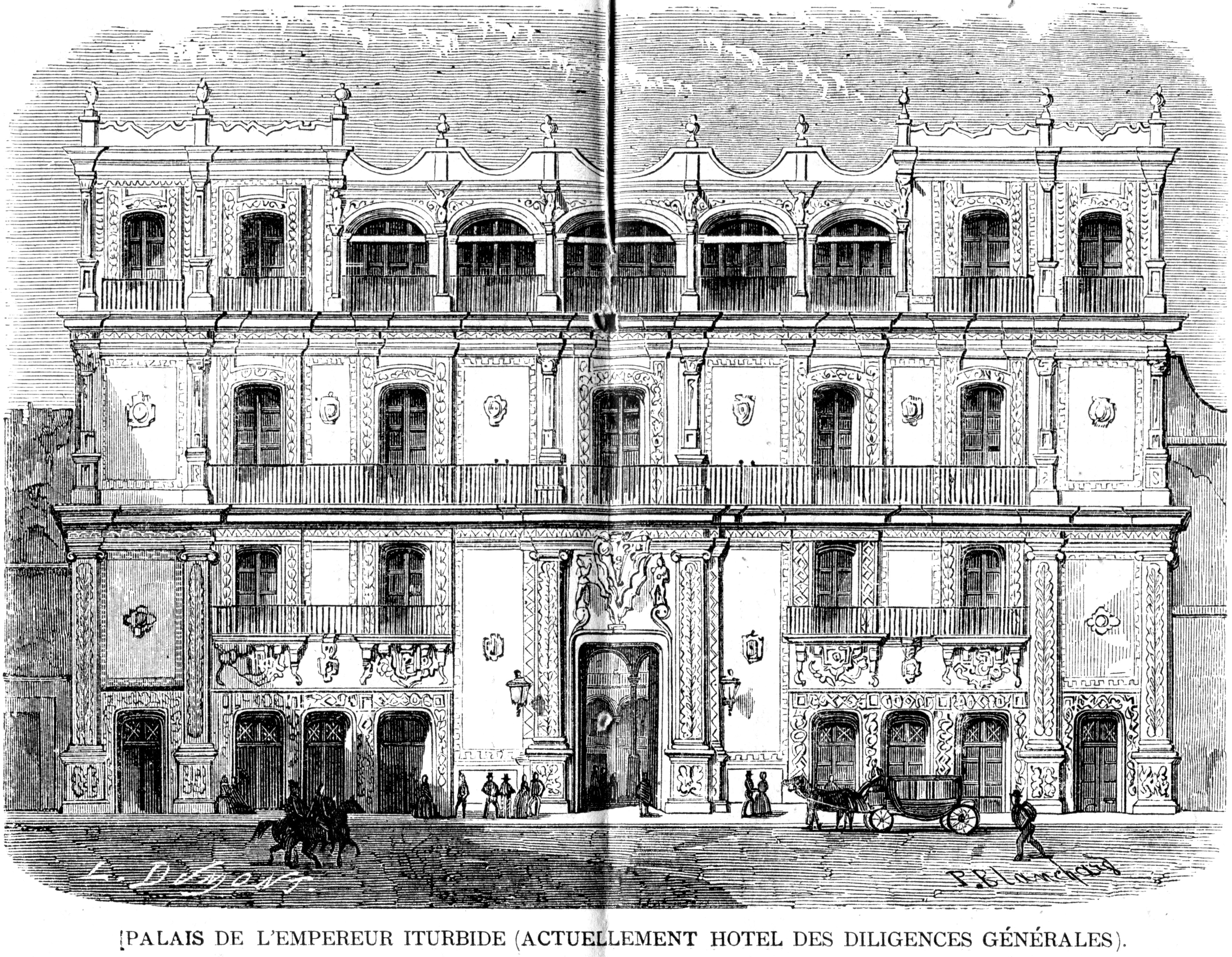
Palace of Iturbide (L'Illustration, 1862)

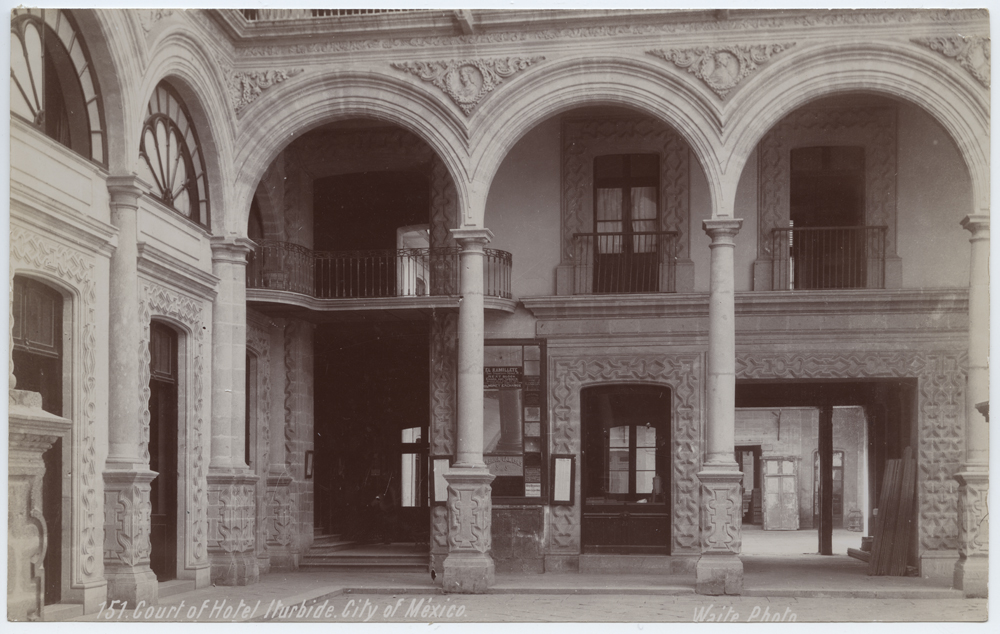
Interior court of the building

This Mexican Baroque building was designed and begun by Francisco Antonio Guerrero y Torres and finished by his brother-in-law Agustín Duran between 1779 and 1785. The building has three floors and a mezzanine, showing Italian influence in its Baroque design. Its façade of tezontle and cantera stone is flanked by two fortified towers at the ends of the façade. It has a central gallery or loggia, which is now closed to the public. The façade is decorated with carved stone that features organic and geometric motifs such as flowers, small double-tailed mermaids and graceful male figures. Inside, the porch has a vaulted roof.

A large archway leads to the courtyard decorated with geometric figures. The courtyard is surrounded by eighteen arches supported by Tuscan columns.

== Later uses ==
Early in the 19th century, the building housed the College of Mining. It was remodeled in 1855 for use as a hotel, serving that function for more than 100 years.

In 1965, the building was purchased and restored by the National Bank of Mexico. In 1972, it became the home of the Banamex Cultural Foundation (Fomento Cultural Banamex).

The foundation spent two years from 2002 to 2004 doing significant restoration work on the building. It reopened the structure for use as the “Palacio de Cultura Banamex.” It hosts numerous temporary art exhibitions, as well as art workshops for adults and children.

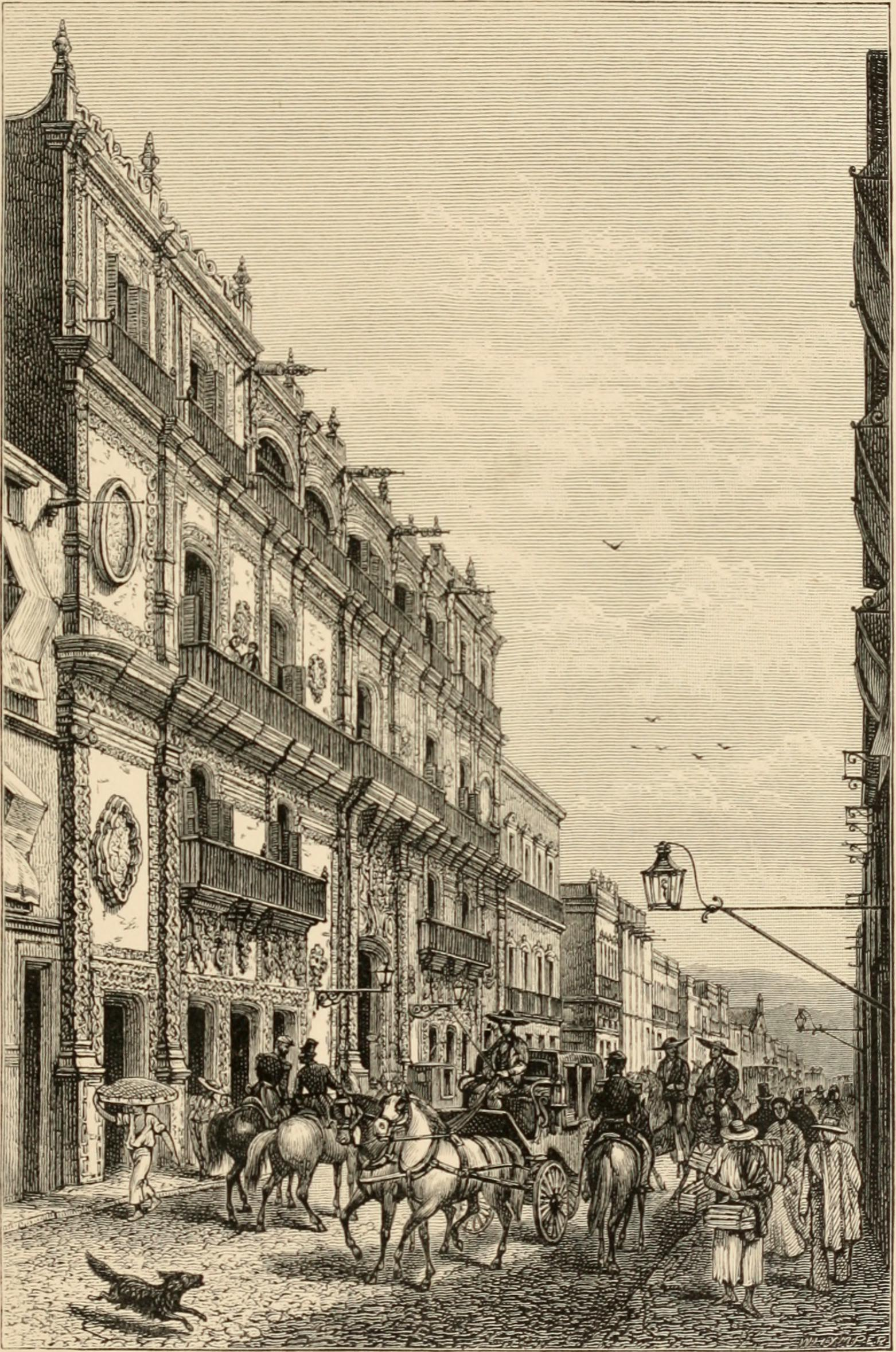
Facade of the Palace of Iturbide in 1883 by Thomas Brocklehurst.

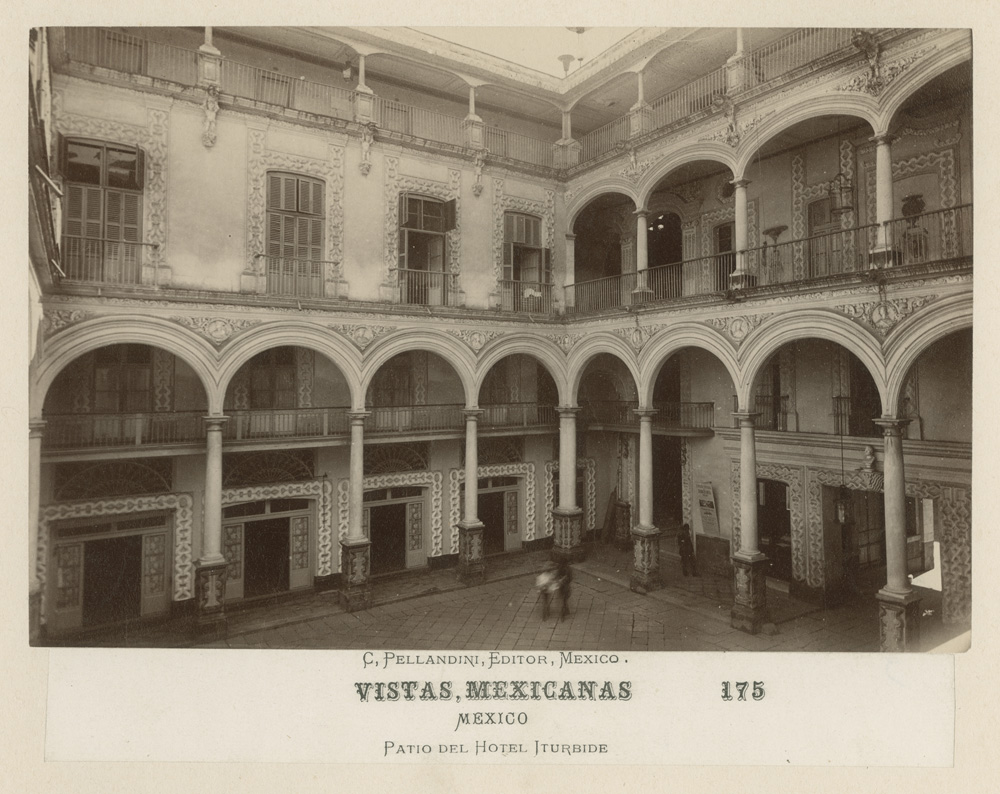
Courtyard of the Palace of Iturbide in 1880 by Abel Briquet.
