= José Ramos Muñoz =

Spanish archaeologist

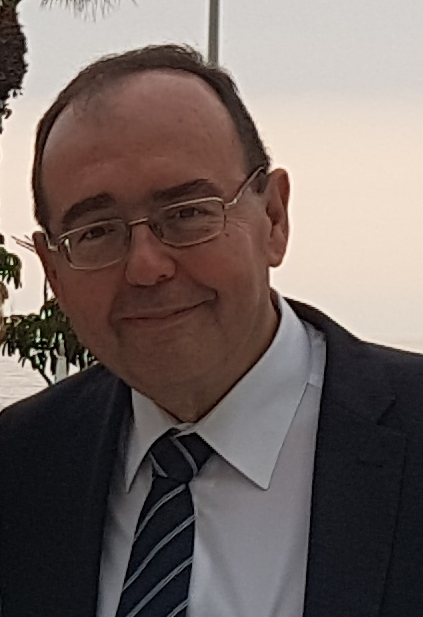
Image of José Ramos Muñoz

José Ramos Muñoz is a Spanish archaeologist and professor of prehistory at the University of Cádiz and director of the Revista Atlántica Mediterránica de Prehistoria y Arqueología Social. Ramos is an influential Spanish-speaking archaeologist with dozens of books and hundreds of published papers. He conducted extensive fieldwork in Europe and Africa. His excavations at the Benzú's Cave, north Africa, with chronologies between 250,000 and 100,000 years BP, represents the first evidence of Mousterian stone industries in Africa.

== Selected bibliography ==
- Ramos, Bernal and Castañeda, ed. 2003. El abrigo y cueva de Benzú en la prehistoria de Ceuta. University of Cádiz.
- Ramos, J. and Bernal, D., ed. 2006. El Proyecto Benzú. 250.000 años de historia en la orilla africana del Círculo del Estrecho.
