= Jose Ramos (boxing manager) =

Puerto Rican boxing manager (born 1965)

Jose Ramos (born 1965), aka Pepe Ramos, is a Puerto Rican boxing manager and salesman.

== Biography ==
Jose Ramos surfaced in the 1990s, after working as a salesman for Puerto Rican cookie brand Rovira Biscuits Corporation in the southern Puerto Rican city of Ponce, when he became famous in the boxing world as Félix Trinidad's career took off. Ramos, Trinidad and Félix Trinidad Sr. were united by a contract, and, in Ramos and Trinidad Jr.'s case, by friendship. Ramos and Trinidad Jr. met in 1991.

Ramos became vital to Trinidad's first era as a boxer, becoming an important link between the Trinidads and promoter Don King. Ramos helped work deals for Félix Trinidad and Oscar De La Hoya, Pernell Whitaker, Yori Boy Campas, Héctor Camacho and David Reid, among others. Ramos was in New York, New York, when the September 11, 2001, terrorist attacks occurred; Trinidad was scheduled to fight Bernard Hopkins at the Madison Square Garden on September 15 of that year. The fight took place on September 29 instead, and Trinidad lost by a twelfth-round knockout.

Trinidad retired after one more fight, a win over Hacine Cherifi. Félix Trinidad Sr. also retired as a manager following his son's retirement. As a consequence, he decided to distribute his other boxers between his close associates, including Ramos. Among the boxers that Ramos received was Fres Oquendo, a Heavyweight contender at the time. Ramos received Oquendo after Oquendo had lost by a ninth-round knockout to David Tua. He received one dollar and an economical remuneration for a lawsuit that he established against Félix Trinidad Sr. in Chicago, Illinois. The lawsuit is still to be decided.

Ramos helped Oquendo get title shots against Chris Byrd, who beat Oquendo by a twelve-round decision for the IBF world Heavyweight title, and against John Ruiz, who knocked Oquendo out in the eleventh round for the WBA world Heavyweight title, the latter fight being also being held at the Madison Square Garden and becoming the first time two Latin Americans and two Puerto Ricans fought for a world Heavyweight championship.

Oquendo later wanted to terminate his contract with Ramos, which caused for a verbal fight to break out between the two in different Puerto Rican media, including newspapers.

Ramos is still the on contract manager of Oquendo, and he returned with Félix Trinidad Jr. for his fights against Ricardo Mayorga and Ronald Wright.

== Trinidad Jr.'s financial problems ==
Ramos purchased about $63,000,000 in bonds for the Trinidads during Felix Jr.'s career. These were bought as an investment, but when Puerto Rico hit a financial crisis during the mid-2010s, their value dropped as Puerto Rican bonds ratings were reduced to junk status, causing the Trinidads to lose the money invested by Ramos.

== See also ==
- List of Puerto Ricans
