= Lorenzo Rodríguez =

Spanish-born Baroque architect in New Spain (1701–1774)

- Main façade of the Sagrario Metropolitano, Mexico City
- Born: Lorenzo Joseph Rodríguez de Spíndola; Baptized 22 August 1701 (Note: The parish registers of Guadix record his baptism on 22 August 1701. Earlier accounts, including Heinrich Berlin's study and the Encyclopædia Britannica, give his year of birth as about 1704.); Guadix, Spain
- Died: 3 July 1774; Mexico City, New Spain
- Occupation: Architect
- Buildings: Sagrario Metropolitano; Palace of the Counts of San Bartolomé de Xala

Lorenzo Rodríguez (baptized 22 August 1701 – 3 July 1774) was a Spanish-born architect who worked in New Spain. His principal work, the Sagrario Metropolitano beside Mexico City Metropolitan Cathedral, begun in 1749, is one of the main monuments of the Churrigueresque style in the Americas, and he is credited with spreading the use of the estípite pilaster in 18th-century Mexico.

== Early life ==
Rodríguez was baptized in Guadix, in the province of Granada, on 22 August 1701 as Lorenzo Joseph Rodríguez de Spíndola. According to his biographer Edgar Antonio Mejía Ortiz, his father, Felipe Santiago Rodríguez de Missas, was a carpenter from Córdoba who worked in Granada and Guadix, and Rodríguez trained in carpentry and stonecutting. Older accounts describe his father as an architect, master builder of the diocese of Guadix, and assume that he was his son's first teacher. Before leaving Spain he worked as aparejador (assistant architect) at Cádiz Cathedral.

== New Spain ==
Rodríguez sailed from Cádiz and is recorded in Mexico City by 1731. He worked at first as a carpenter at the Mint (Casa de Moneda), where he made the altar table of its chapel and its great door. There he probably came into contact with Jerónimo de Balbás, the author of the Altar of the Kings in the cathedral (1718–1737), whose work influenced him. During a dispute with the architect Miguel Custodio Durán in 1742, Rodríguez cited his work at the Mint and the water pumps and ore-crushing machinery he had built for mines, among them a pump for the Jesuits at Tepotzotlán. The church façade at Tepotzotlán has often been attributed to him, but no document confirms it.

On 31 August 1740 Rodríguez passed his master's examination before Miguel Custodio Durán, Manuel Álvarez and the military engineer Luis Díez Navarro. He later served as veedor (inspector) of the architects' guild. In 1741 he directed the construction of the viceroys' house at Huehuetoca, designed by Díez Navarro. Between 1756 and 1758 he was maestro mayor (chief architect) of the Royal Palace and the cathedral, and on 24 April 1758 the Inquisition appointed him its architect, for which he built houses on what is now República de Colombia street.

His last documented work was at the Mint, where in 1773 he was given the technical direction of a large extension to designs by the military engineer Miguel Constansó, who worked in a sober neoclassical style. He fell ill in March 1774 and died in Mexico City on 3 July 1774.

== Works ==
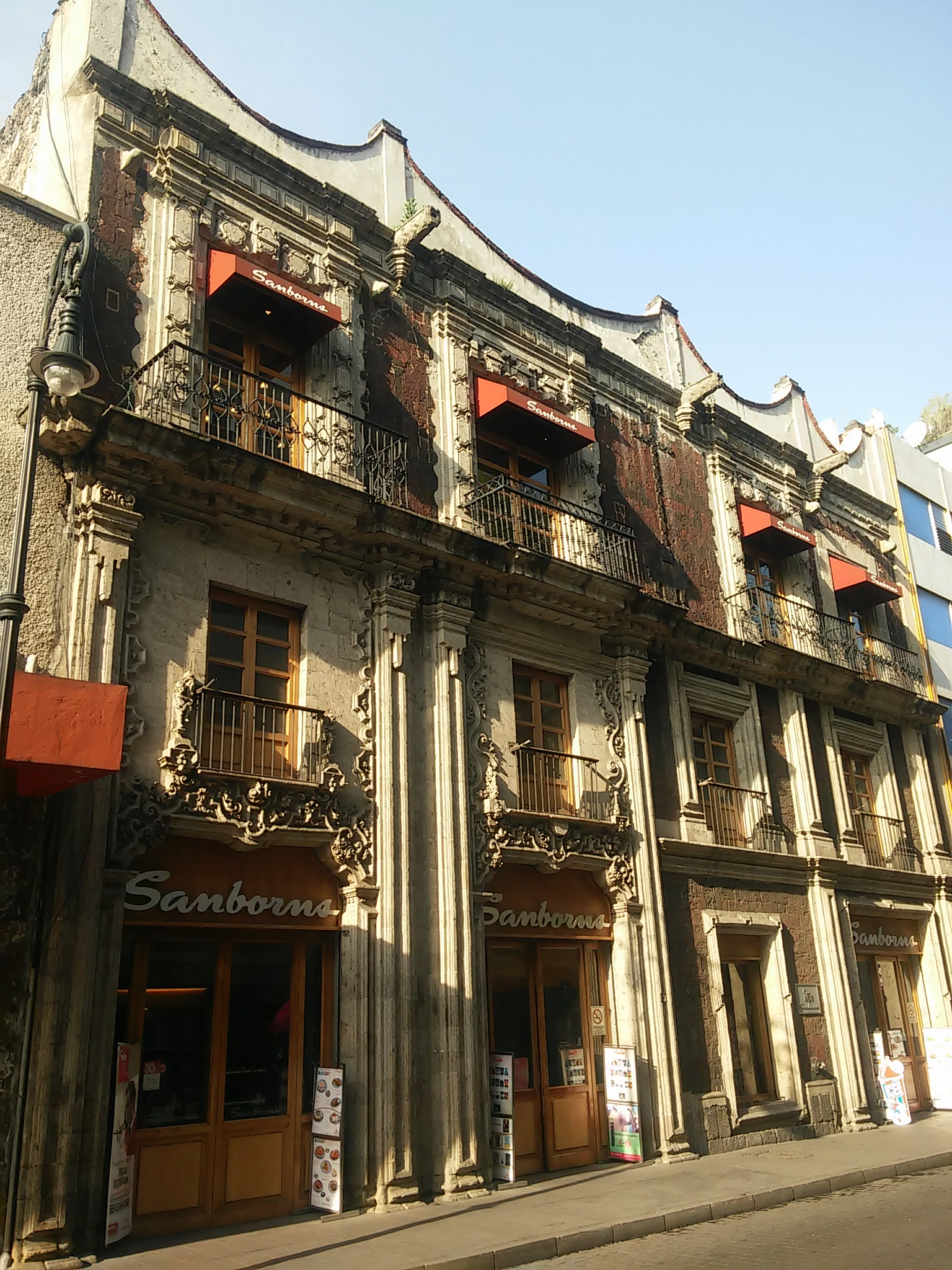
The Palace of the Counts of San Bartolomé de Xala (1763–1764)

His best-known work is the Sagrario Metropolitano, the parish church built beside the cathedral from 1749. Its two façades, facing south and east, are covered with estípites, cornices and statues, and were praised in 1777 by the chronicler Juan de Viera as a model for architecture and sculpture. He also built the doorway of the chapel of the Colegio de las Vizcaínas.

For the nobility of Mexico City he built a house for the Marquesa del Villar del Águila on the corner of San Bernardo street and the Plaza del Volador, another at the corner of Santo Domingo and Talabarteros streets, and the Palace of the Counts of San Bartolomé de Xala (1763–1764) on what is now Venustiano Carranza street, which survives. In 1764 he built houses for the University near its main building.

Several other works are attributed to him on less certain grounds. INAH credits him with the rear façade of the Colegio de San Ildefonso, and the columnist Ángeles González Gamio adds the church of La Santísima and the Balvanera chapel at San Francisco. Britannica describes La Santísima as probably his, and also credits him with the chapel of the convent of Santo Domingo, dedicated in 1757 and since demolished. Berlin, however, found no evidence for his authorship of the Third Order chapel at Santo Domingo, and rejected Manuel Romero de Terreros's attribution of the façade of the old University: the University's records show that in 1759 it chose a design by Ildefonso de Iniesta Vejarano over one submitted by Rodríguez.

== Legacy ==
Britannica describes Rodríguez as the originator of the Mexican Churrigueresque, and notes that his influence is clearest in the mining region of Guanajuato, where his followers built extensively. Mejía Ortiz names Iniesta Vejarano as the architect who most closely followed his manner.
