= José Ramos Castillo =

Spanish swimmer (born 1974)

José Ramos
Personal information
- Full name: José Arnulfo Ramos Castillo
- Nationality: Spanish
- Born: 24 December 1974 (age 51) Castellón de la Plana, Castellón, Spain

Sport
- Country: Spain
- Sport: Swimming (S7)
Medal record
Swimming
Representing Spain
Paralympic Games
Bronze medal – third place	2004 Athens	4x50m medley relay 20pts

José Arnulfo Ramos Castillo (born 24 December 1974 in Castellón de la Plana, Castellón) is an S7 butterfly and freestyle swimmer from Spain. In 2004, he lived in Artesa-onda, Castellón. He competed at the 2004 Summer Paralympics winning a bronze medal in the 4 x 50 meter 20 points medley relay.
