= Tezontle =

Light red volcanic rock

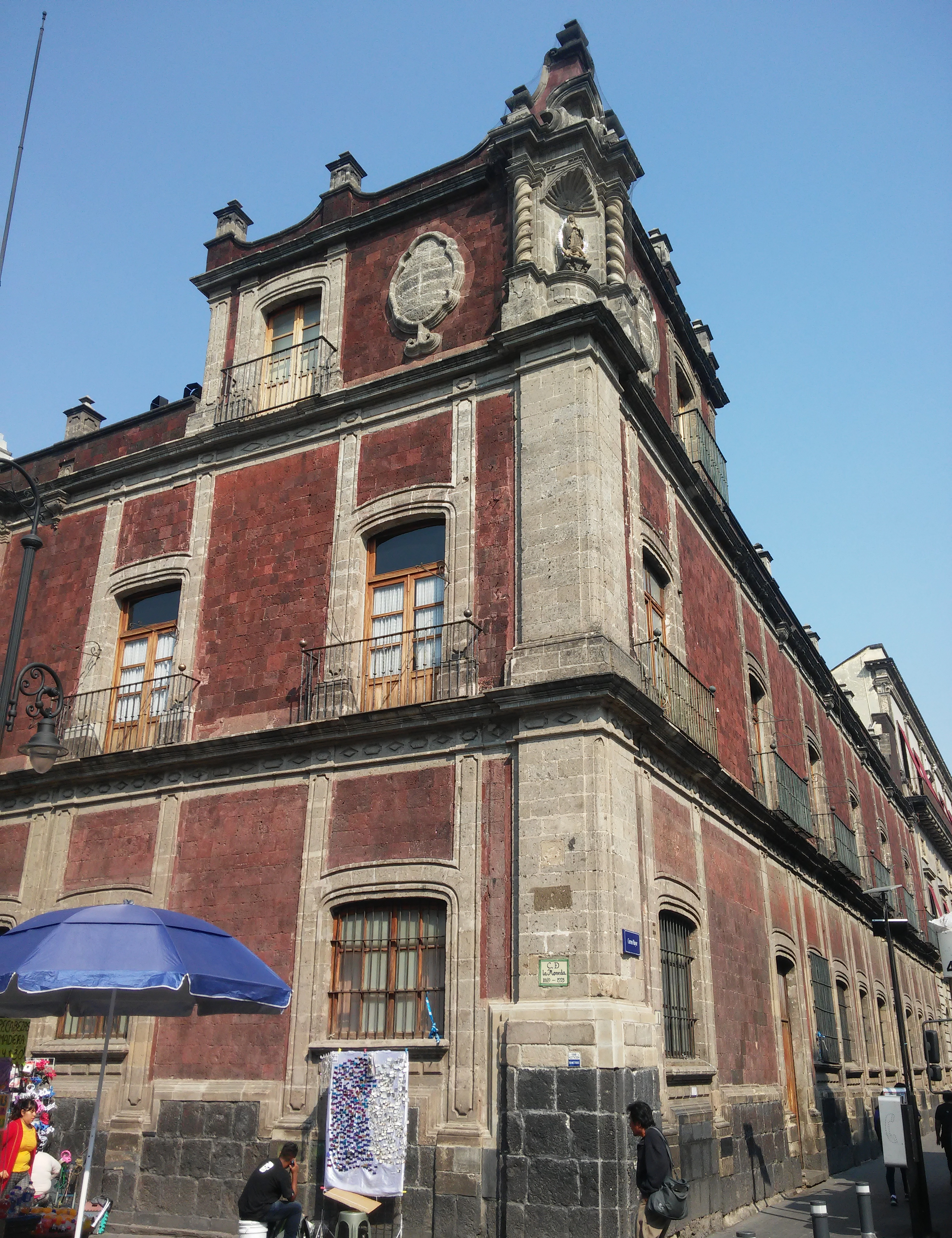
One of the Houses of the Mayorazgo de Guerrero showing tezontle walls with cantera accents.

Tezontle (Spanish: tezontle) is a porous, highly oxidized, volcanic rock used extensively in construction in Mexico. It is usually reddish in color due to iron oxide. Tezontle is a well-cemented, agglomeritic and scoriaceous rock.

== Uses ==
=== Construction ===
Tezontle can be mixed with concrete to form lightweight concrete blocks, or mixed with cement to create stucco finishes. Many colonial buildings in Mexico use the reddish cut tezontle on their facades.

Tezontle is a common construction material in the Historic Center of Mexico City as the relatively light-weight stone helps impede a building from sinking into the unstable lake bed on which Mexico City was built.

=== Other uses ===
Non-building uses include its inclusion in flower arrangements and botanical gardens, as substrate for aquariums, and for temazcales and ovens.

Tezontle is often used as the top layer of gravel on unpaved roads in Mexico.

== Facades ==
Many buildings use tezontle to create an aesthetic facade. Here are some examples.

- Church of San Bernardo, Mexico City
- House of Count de la Torre de Cossio
- Mexico City Metropolitan Cathedral
- Nacional Monte de Piedad
- National Palace (Mexico)
