= Historic center of Mexico City =

Central neighborhood in Mexico City

Historic center of Mexico City Centro Histórico de la Ciudad de México
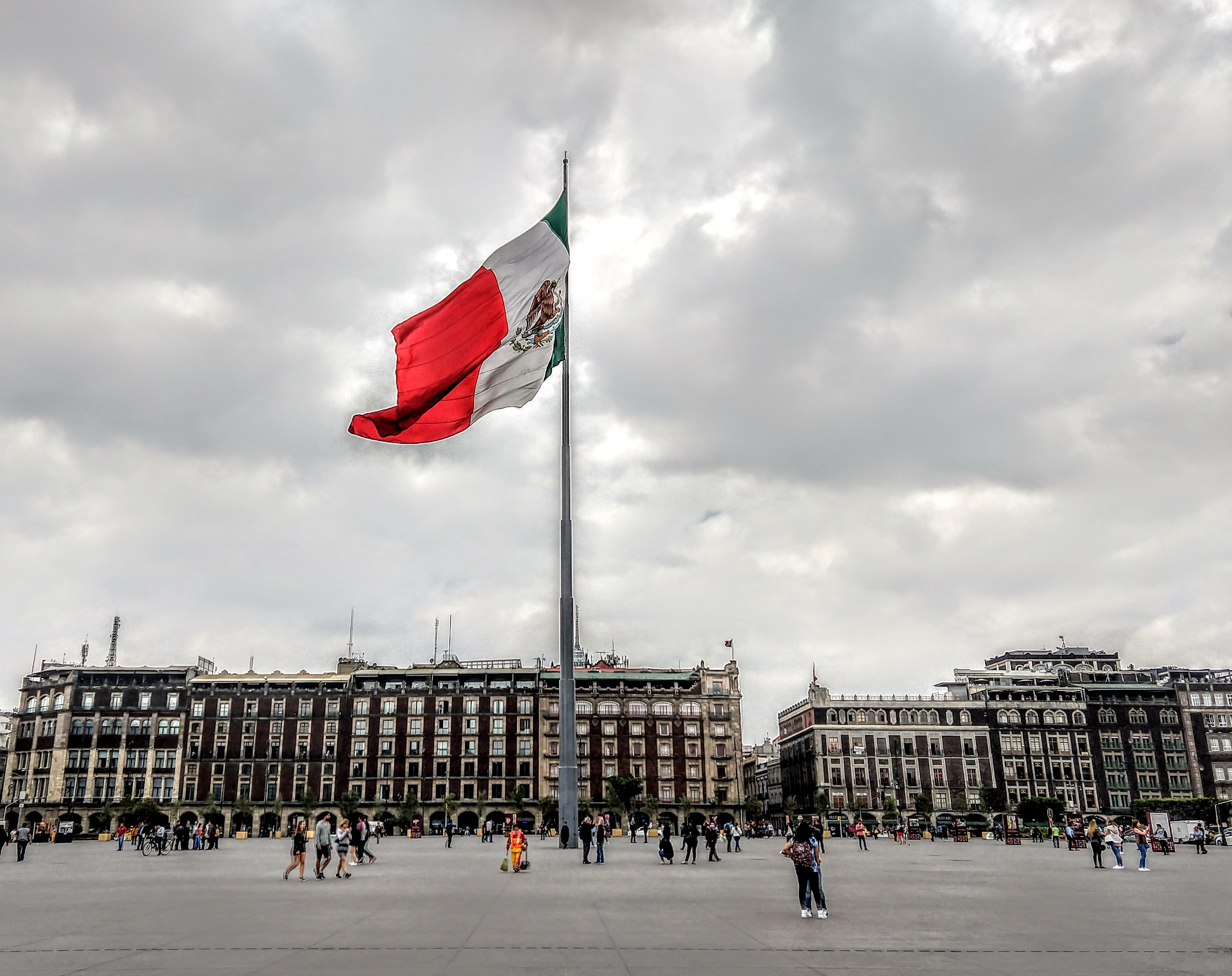
- The Zócalo also known as Plaza de la Constitución with the Mexican flag waving in the center and to the right behind it, the Old Portal de Mercaderes
- Interactive map of Historic center of Mexico City
- Coordinates: 19°25′58″N 99°07′59″W
- Country: Mexico
- City: Mexico City
- Borough: Cuauhtémoc

Population (2020)
  - Total: 61,229
- Time zone: UTC−6 (CST)
  - Summer (DST): UTC−5 (CDT)

UNESCO World Heritage Site
- Official name: Historic Centre of Mexico City and Xochimilco
- Type: Cultural
- Criteria: ii, iii, iv, v
- Designated: 1987 (11th session)
- Reference no.: 412
- Region: Latin America and the Caribbean

The historic center of Mexico City (Spanish: Centro Histórico de la Ciudad de México), also known as the Centro or Centro Histórico, is the central neighborhood in Mexico City, Mexico, focused on the Zócalo (or main plaza) and extending in all directions for a number of blocks, with its farthest extent being west to the Alameda Central. The Zocalo is the largest plaza in Latin America; it can hold up to nearly 100,000 people.

This section of the capital lies in the municipal borough of Cuauhtémoc, has just over nine km^{2} and occupies 668 blocks. It contains 9,000 buildings, 1,550 of which have been declared of historical importance. Most of these historic buildings were constructed between the 16th and 20th centuries. It is divided into two zones for preservation purposes. Zone A encompasses the pre-Hispanic city and its expansion from the Viceroy period until Independence. Zone B covers the areas all other constructions to the end of the 19th century that are considered indispensable to the preservation of the area's architectural and cultural heritage.

This is where the Spaniards began to build what is now modern Mexico City in the 16th century on the ruins of the conquered Tenochtitlan, capital of the Aztec Empire. As the centre of the Aztec Empire and the seat of power for the Spanish colony of New Spain, the Centro Historico contains most of the city's historic sites from both eras as well as a large number of museums. This has made it a World Heritage Site.

== History ==
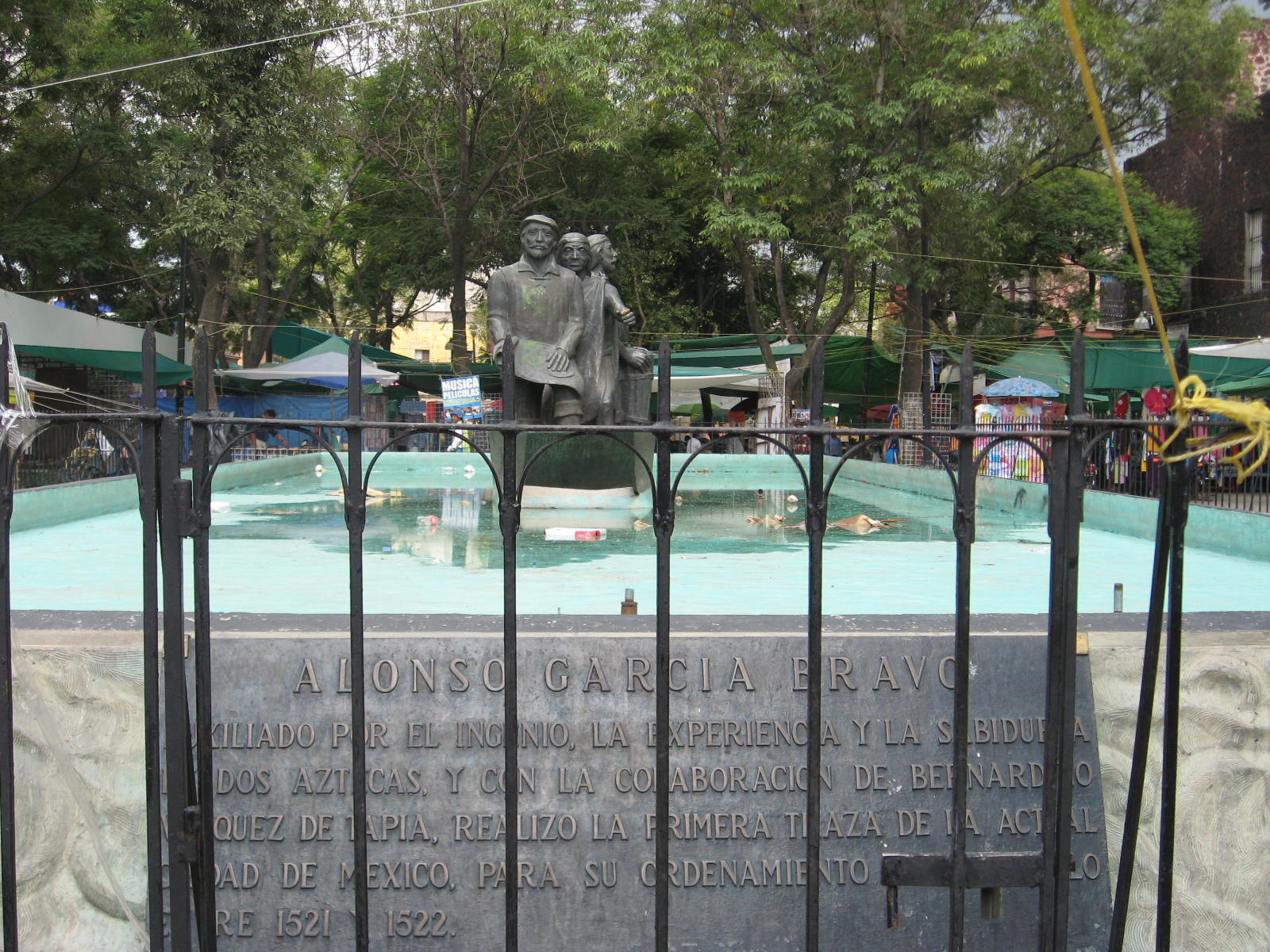
Fountain with busts honoring Alonso Garcia Bravo, who laid out post-Conquest Mexico City conserving much of the original Aztec infrastructure. Located off Merced Street between Jesus María and Talavera, east of the Zocalo.

What is now the historic downtown of Mexico City roughly correlates with the ancient Aztec city of Tenochtitlan, which was founded around 1325. During the prehispanic era, the city developed in a planned fashion, with streets and canals aligned with the cardinal directions, leading to orderly square blocks. The island that the city was founded on was divided into four calpullis or neighborhoods that were divided by the main north-south roads leading to Tepeyac and Iztapalapa respectively and the west-east road that lead to Tacuba and to a dike into the lake, respectively. The calpullis were named Cuepopan, Atzacualco, Moyotla and Zoquipan, which had subdivisions and a "tecpan" or district council each. The intersection of these roads was the center of the city and of the Aztec world. Here were the Templo Mayor, the palaces of the tlatoani or emperors, palaces of nobles such as the "House of the Demons" and the "House of the Flowers". Also located here were the two most renowned Aztec schools: the Telpuchcalli for secular studies and the Calmecac for priestly training. When the Spaniards arrived, the city had aqueducts built by Moctezuma Ilhuicamina and Ahuizotl as well as a large dike constructed to the east of the city.

After the Spanish conquest, this design remained largely intact, mostly due to the efforts of Alonso Garcia Bravo, who supervised much of the rebuilding of the city. This reconstruction conserved many of the main thoroughfares such as Tenayuca, renamed Vallejo; Tlacopan, renamed México Tacuba, and Tepeyac, now called the Calzada de los Misterios. They also kept major divisions of the city adding Christian prefixes to the names such as San Juan Moyotla, Santa María Tlaquechiuacan, San Sebastián Atzacualco and San Pedro Teopan. In fact, most of the centro historicos is built with the rubble of the destroyed Aztec city.

A number of people during this time, all Spaniards, accumulated vast wealth mostly through mining and commerce in the 17th and 18th centuries. This wealth is reflected in the various mansions scattered in the centro such as the Palace of Iturbide and Casa de Azulejos (House of Tiles). This house was built in the 16th century in Arab style but its namesake tiles were added in 1747 when the Count of the Valley of Orizaba ordered the Talavera tiles from Puebla.

In the early part of the 20th century, as a result of the Latin American posture of then-Minister of Public Education José Vasconcelos, many of the streets to the north and west of the Zocalo were renamed after Latin American countries.

== The Zócalo and surrounding sites ==
Historically, the Zócalo, or main plaza, has been a venue for fine and popular cultural events. Some example of events held here recently are Spencer Tunick's photo shoot, the Ashes and Snow Nomadic museum and a skateboarding/BMX event that drew 50,000 young people on 24 August 2008. The Festival de México is an annual event with programs dedicated to art (popular and high) and academia. In 2008, was the 24th Festival with 254 performances and shows from over 20 countries in 65 plazas and other locations in this section of the city.

It is central to national level protests such as those staged by Lopez Obrador after the 2006 Presidential Elections and the nationwide protest against crime held on August 30, 2008.

Just off the Zócalo are the Palacio Nacional, the Cathedral Metropolitana, the Templo Mayor with its adjoining museum, and Nacional Monte de Piedad building. The Palacio Nacional borders the entire east side of the Zocalo and contains the offices of the President of Mexico, the Federal Treasury, the National Archives as well as murals depicting pre-Hispanic life and a large mural filling the central stairway depicting the entire history of the Mexican nation from the Conquest on. This palace was built on the ruins of Moctezuma II's palace beginning in 1521, using the same tezontle stone used to build the Aztec palace. It was originally in the Hernán Cortés family until the king of Spain bought it to house the viceroys of New Spain and remained so (despite being destroyed and rebuilt again in 1692) until Mexican independence. Facing the Zócalo above a central balcony is the Campana (Bell) of Dolores, which is rung by the president each 15th of Sept to celebrate Independence.

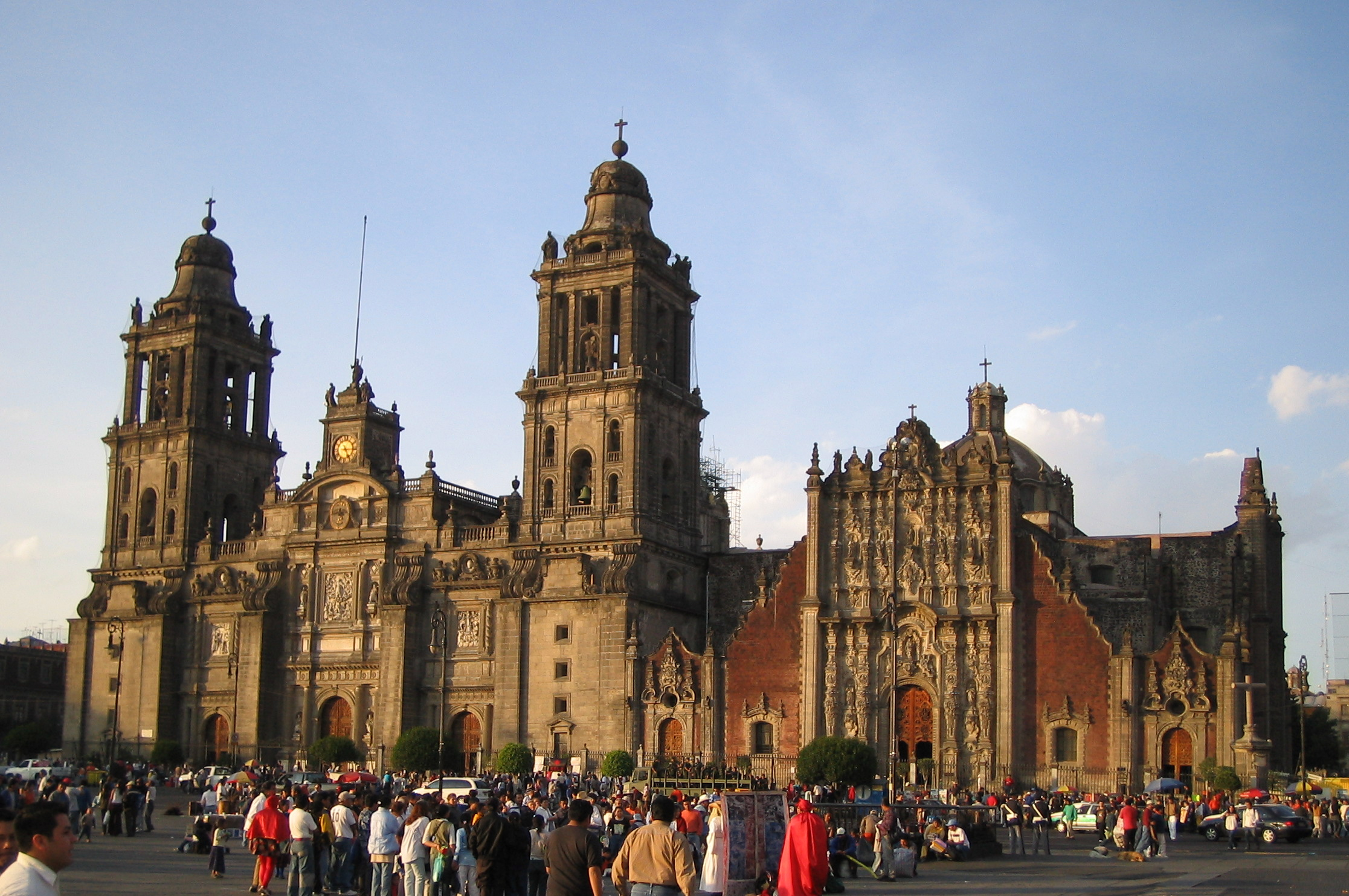
Mexico City Cathedral

The Metropolitan Cathedral, dedicated to the Assumption of the Most Blessed Virgin Mary, occupies the north end of the Zócalo. The site originally was part of the Aztec Sacred Precinct (called the Teocalli) and contained the main tzompantli, or rack for the skulls of sacrifice victims. The first church was erected between 1524 or 1526 and 1532 and was elevated to the rank of cathedral on 2 September 1530 by Pope Clement VII. The foundations for a new cathedral were begun in 1562 and the foundation stone was laid in 1573 in the time of Archbishop Pedro Moya de Contreras and of the 4th Viceroy. Although the works had not been concluded, the cathedral received its first dedication on 2 February 1656. The completion in 1813 of the neo-classical additions designed by Manuel Tolsá was celebrated on 15 August 2013 by Cardinal Carrera who opened and entered through the Holy Door in the center of the façade prior to celebrating Pontifical High Mass in the cathedral.

Between 1989 and 2000 extensive engineering works were conducted to arrest and rectify damage and distortions caused to the structure by the uneven rate and extent of the sinking of the building provoked by the continuous settlement of the ground on which it stands. This began with the drainage of the lake of the Valley of Mexico initiated in 1607 and has continued with the reduction of the water-table caused by the pumping of water for use by Mexico City's rapidly expanding population. The last of the temporary props which had disfigured the interior of the building during the engineering works were removed on 28 November 2000.

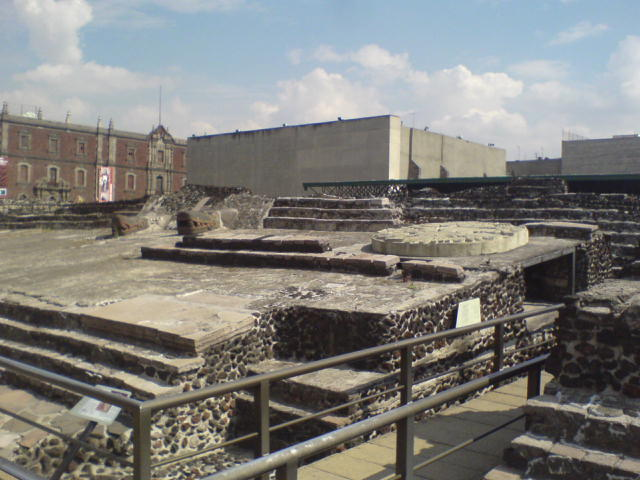
A view of the ruins of the Templo Mayor with museum in background

The Templo Mayor archeological site and museum, is the center of the ancient teocalli, located now just northeast of the Zócalo. It was demolished by Hernán Cortés in the 1520s and its location forgotten. The exact site was determined in the beginning of the 20th century, but the decision to excavate was not made until 1978, when electrical workers chanced upon an eight-ton stone disk depicting the Aztec goddess Coyolxauhqui. Excavation unearthed a pyramid built in multiple layers. This is the spot where, according to legend, the Aztecs saw their sign to settle from their wanderings, an eagle perched on a nopal cactus with a snake in its beak, which is still the symbol of Mexico today.

The Nacional Monte de Piedad building is the national pawn shop, founded in 1775 and one of the largest second-hand shops in the world. On this site were houses that belonged to the last Aztec ruler, Moctezuma II, which Hernán Cortés took for his own after the Conquest. These houses originally stretched from modern-day Isabel la Catolica, Madero, Tacuba and Monte de Piedad streets, prompting one chronicler, Cervantes de Salazar to comment that the residence was not a palace but rather another city.

== Notable sites north of the Zócalo ==
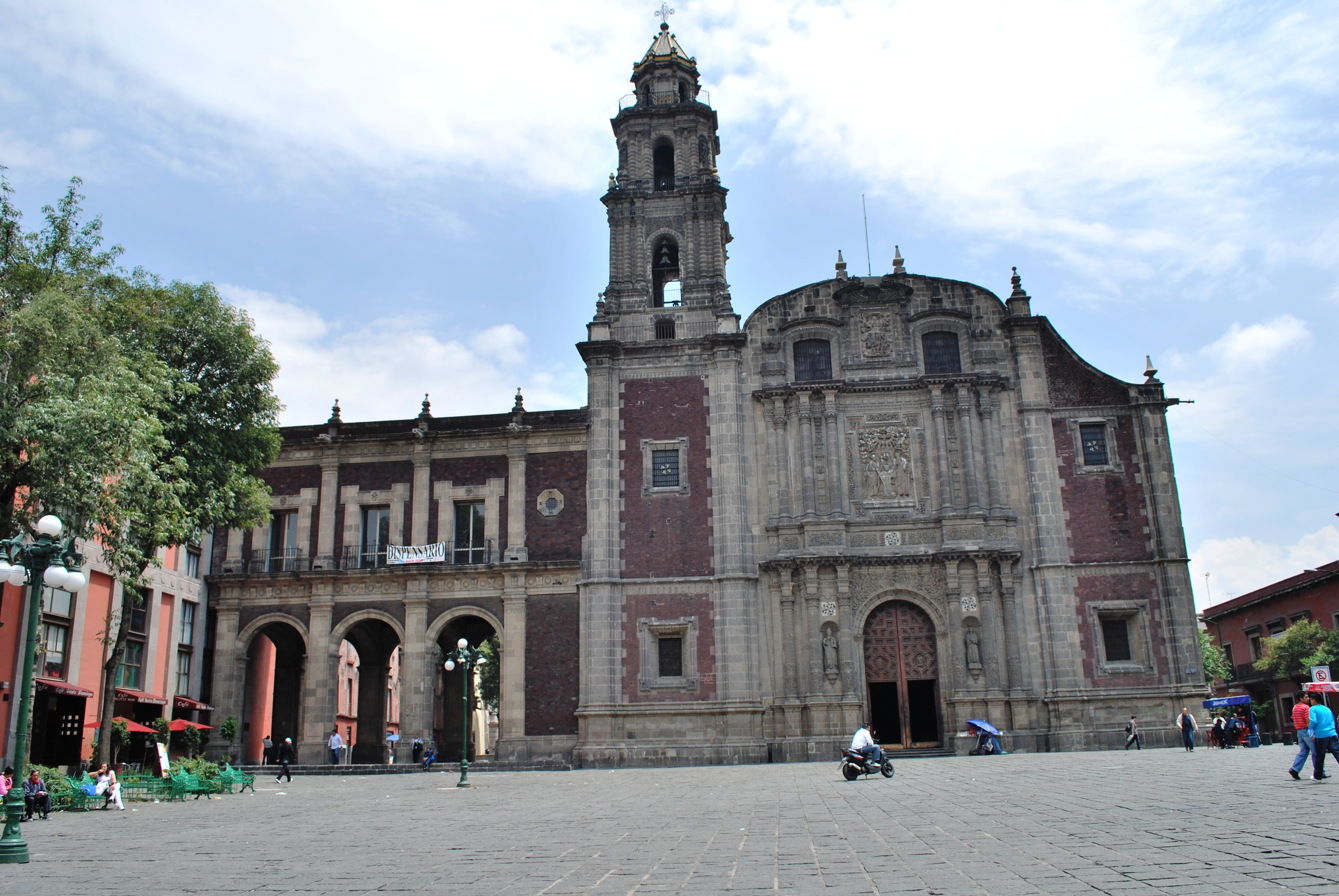
Façade of the Church of Santo Domingo

Santo Domingo refers to the Church of Santo Domingo and the adjoining plaza. Both are located three blocks north of the Mexico City Metropolitan Cathedral following Republica de Brasil Street with Belisario Dominguez Street separating the two. Officially known as the Señor de la Expiación Chapel, the church is located on the north side of Belisario Dominguez and faces the plaza. It is all that is left from the first convent to be established in New Spain. To the south of the church is Plaza San Domingo. It is flanked to the west by the Portal de Evangelistas, which is a Tuscan colonnade with round arches. Scribes with typewriters and antique printing machines work in this Portal. Scribes offer their services to illiterate clients, often offering services similar to that of lawyers, counselors, and financial consultants. A statue of Josefa Ortiz de Domínguez, a heroine of the Mexican War of Independence stands in a fountain in the middle of the plaza.

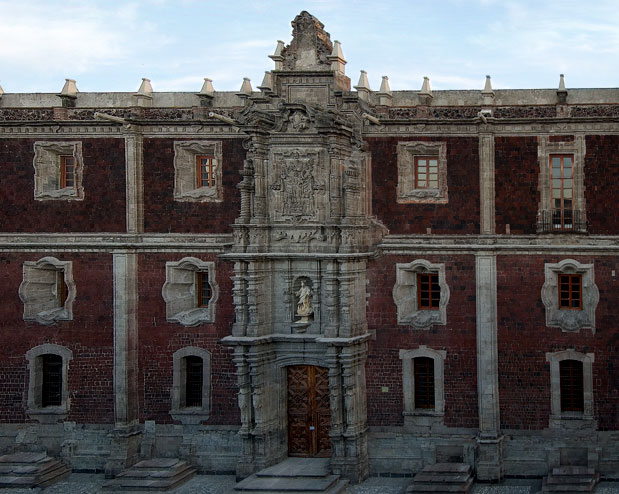
A part of the façades of the former San Ildefonso College, now a museum

The San Ildefonso College currently is a museum and cultural center considered to be the birthplace of the Mexican muralism movement. San Ildefonso began as a prestigious Jesuit boarding school, and after the Reform War, it gained educational prestige again as National Preparatory School. This school and the building closed completely in 1978, then reopened as a museum and cultural center in 1994. The museum has permanent and temporary art and archeological exhibitions in addition to the many murals painted on its walls by José Clemente Orozco, Diego Rivera and others. The complex is located between San Ildefonso Street and Justo Sierra Street in the historic center of Mexico City.

- Secretaría de Educación Pública at Calle Argentina
- Centro Cultural de España (Cultural Center of Spain), located on Republica de Guatemala street just north of the Mexico City Cathedral
- Museum Archive of Photography, located at the corner of Republica de Guatemala and Republica de Argentina Street
- Lirico Theatre, located on Republica de Cuba street
- Antigua Escuela de Economía (Old School of Economics), located on Republica de Cuba Street
- Colegio Nacional, located on The Colegio Nacional Building, located on Luis Gonzalez Obregon Street
- Old Customs building, on Republica de Brasil just off the Plaza Santo Domingo
- Palace of the Inquisition (Museum of Mexican Medicine) located on Republica de Brasil

== Notable sites south of the Zócalo ==
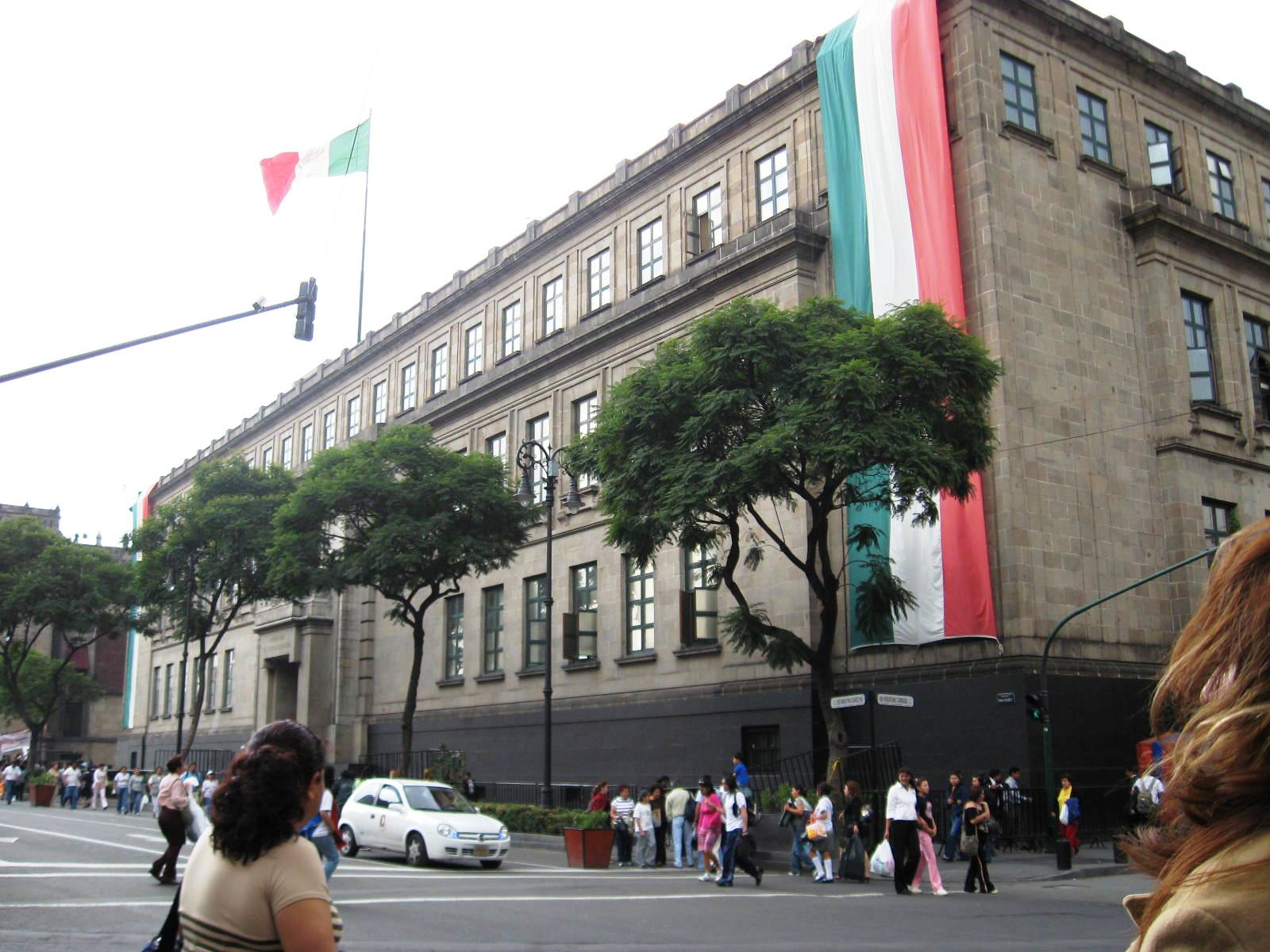
The Supreme Court building

The Supreme Court of Justice of the Nation is located just off the Zócalo, on the corners of Pino Suárez and Carranza Streets. It was built between 1935 and 1941 by Antonio Muñoz Garcia. Prior to the Conquest, this site was reserved for the ritual known as "Dance of the Flyers" which is still practiced today in Papantla. Its ownership was in dispute during much of the colonial period, eventually becoming the site of a very large market known as El Volador. The interior of the building contains four panels painted in 1941 by José Clemente Orozco, two of which are named "The Social Labor Movement" and "National Wealth." There is also one mural done by American artist George Biddle entitled "War and Peace" at the entrance to the library.

- Temple of Saint Augustine Located on Avenida Republica de El Salvador
- The original El Palacio de Hierro store located on Carranza and 20 de noviembre streets
- The original Liverpool department store on Carranza and 20 de noviembre streets
- Saint Augustine House Located on Republica de Uruguay and 5 de Febrero streets
- The Chapel of the Most Holy Conception of Tlaxcoaque, one of the oldest churches in Mexico City, on Fray Servando de Mier
- Church of San Bernardo off the Zocalo

== Notable sites west of the Zocalo ==
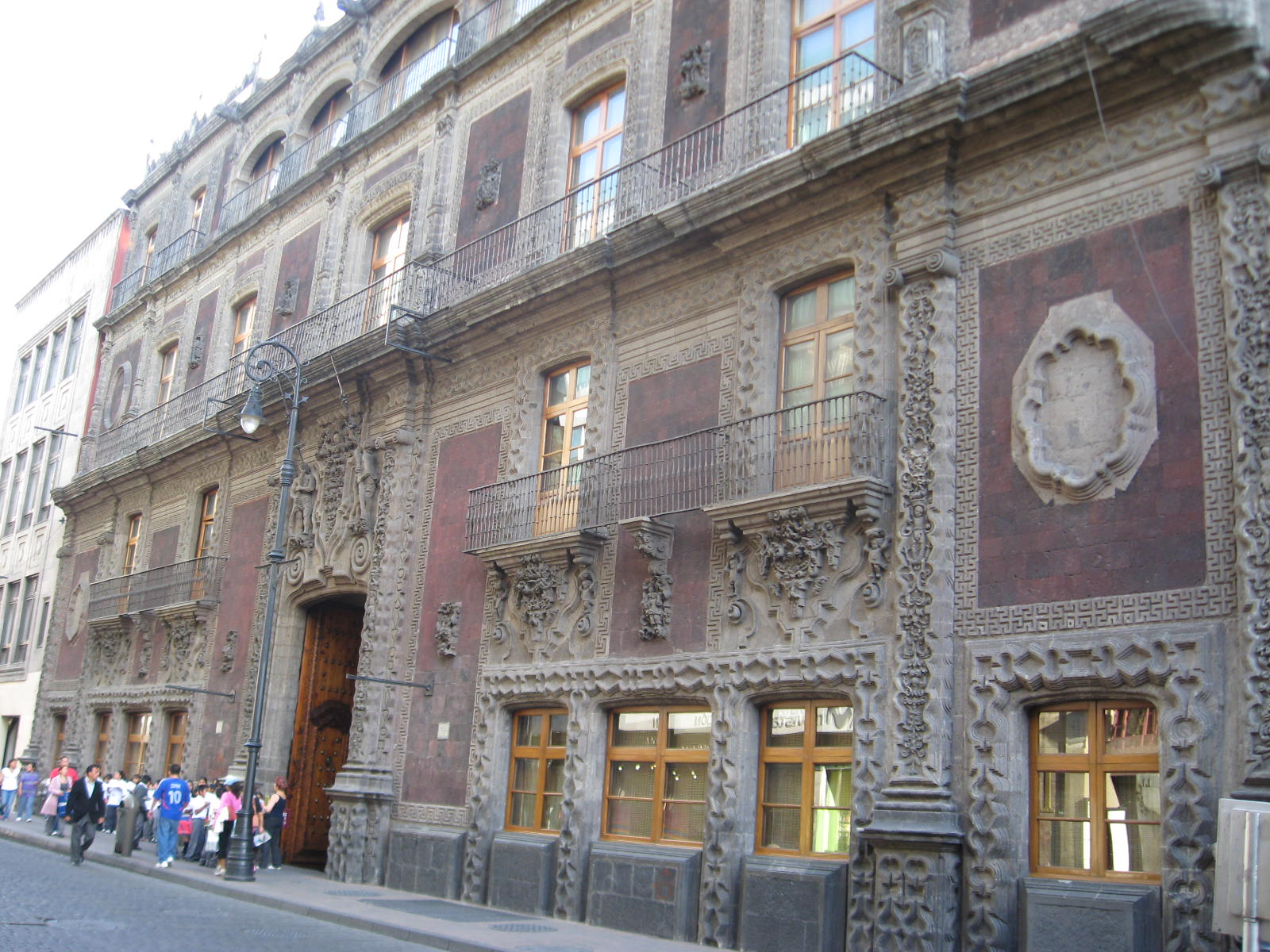
Façade of the Palace of Iturbide

The Palace of Iturbide - this large palatial home on Madero Street #17 was built by the Count of San Mateo Valparaíso in the 18th century as a wedding gift for his daughter. It gained the name "Palace of Iturbide" because Agustín de Iturbide lived and accepted the crown as Mexico's first emperor there after independence from Spain. Today, the restored building houses the Fomento Cultural Banamex and has been renamed the Palacio de Cultura Banamex.

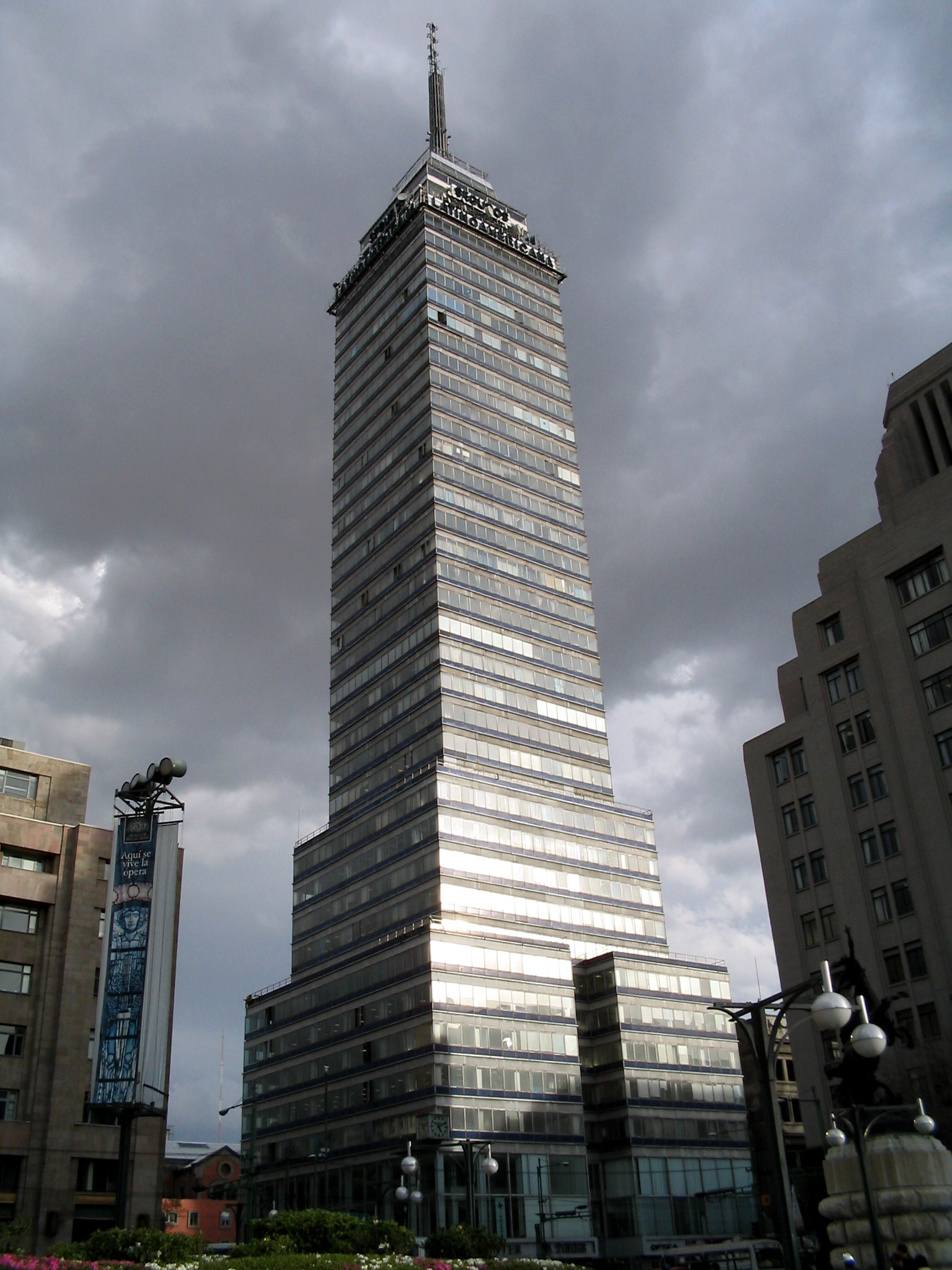
Torre Latinoamericana

The Torre Latinoamericana - This is one of the best-known skyscrapers in Latin America. It was begun in 1948 and completed in 1956 and stands at a height of 182 meters (597 ft), antennae included. It is located on the corner of Eje Central and Juarez Streets. It was the tallest tower in Mexico prior to the construction of Torre Pemex. The building has survived two major earthquakes since it was built, one in 1957 and the other in 1985.

The Museo Nacional de Arte (MUNAL) is the Mexican National Art Museum, housed in a neoclassical building at No. 8 Tacuba, Colonia Centro. It houses a collection representing the history of Mexican art from the late pre-Hispanic era to the early 20th century. It is recognizable by Manuel Tolsá's large equestrian statue of Charles IV of Spain who was the monarch just before Mexico gained its Independence. It was originally in the Zocalo but it was moved to several locations, not out of deference to the king but rather to conserve a piece of art, according to the plaque at the base. It arrived to its final location in 1979.

The Palacio de Correos de Mexico (Postal Palace of Mexico City) also known as the "Correo Mayor" (Main Post Office) is located on the Eje Central (Lázaro Cárdenas) near the Palacio de Bellas Artes. It is an early 20th-century building built in the style of an Italian Renaissance palace. It was designed by Italian Adamo Boari, who also designed part of the Palacio de Bellas Artes across the street.

- Casa de los Azulejos a former mansion completely covered in blue and white Puebla tile between Avenida Madero and Avenida Cinco de Mayo
- Colegio de Minería (College of Mining) on Tacuba Street
- Mexican Army Museum originally Bethlemites Hospital, located at Tacuba and Mata
- Garden of the Triple Alliance on corner of Tacuba and Mata
- Cámara de Senadores on Xicoténcatl Street
- Museo de Estanquillo (cartoons and magazines) on corner of Isabel la Catolica and Madero
- Temple of San Felipe Neri "La Profesa" with collection of artwork from the 17th to 20th centuries, and guided tours on Saturdays from 1200 to 1400 hrs
- Interactive Museum of Economics on Tacuba Street
- Santa Clara church - Library of Congress on corner of Tacuba and Mata
- Senate of Mexico Chambers on corner of Donceles and Xicotencatl streets
- Chamber of Deputies on Donceles Street
- Teatro de la Ciudad on Donceles Street
- Academia Mexicana on Donceles 66

== Notable sites east of the Zócalo ==
The Museo de la Secretaría de Hacienda y Crédito Público is an art museum located at Moneda Street #4. It is housed in what was the Palacio del Arzobispado (Palace of the Archbishopric), built in 1530 under Friar Juan de Zumárraga on the base of the destroyed pyramid dedicated to the Aztec god Tezcatlipoca. It remained the archbishphoric until 1867 when the Finance Ministry Accountancy Department was established there. The modern museum houses an exhibit dedicated to this god as well as a large art collection.

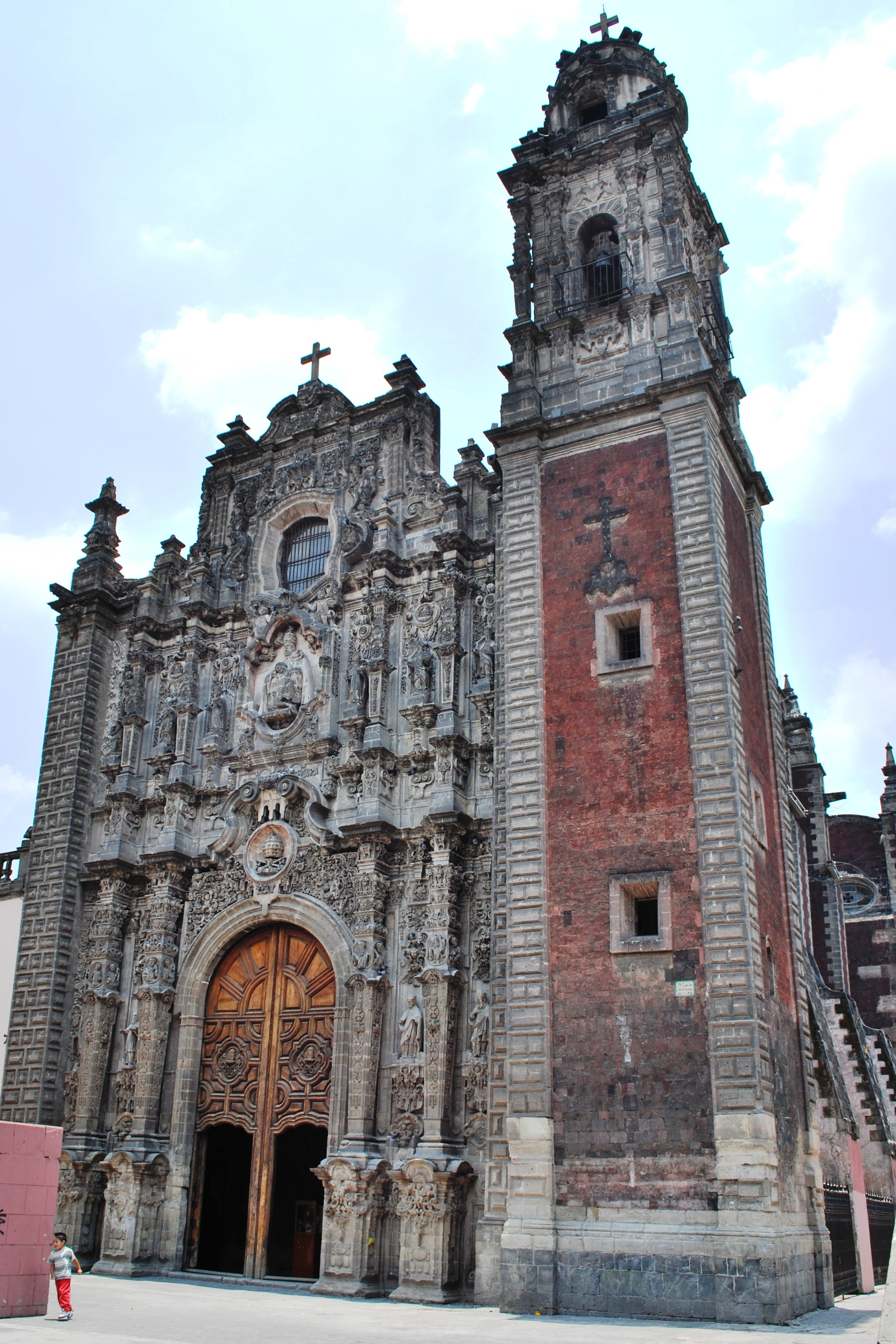
Façade of La Santísima

La Santísima Church is located at the corner of La Santísima and Emiliano Zapata streets. Its full name is Temple and Hospital of the Most Holy Trinity (Templo y Antiguo Hospital de la Santisíma Trinidad). The church was built between 1755 and 1783 as a temple for the adjoining hospital/hospice for priests. The church still retains its original function but the adjoining hospital and office sites have since moved into private hands with only parts of the original structures still intact and preserved. The church is also noted for the fact that it has sunk almost three meters since it was built.

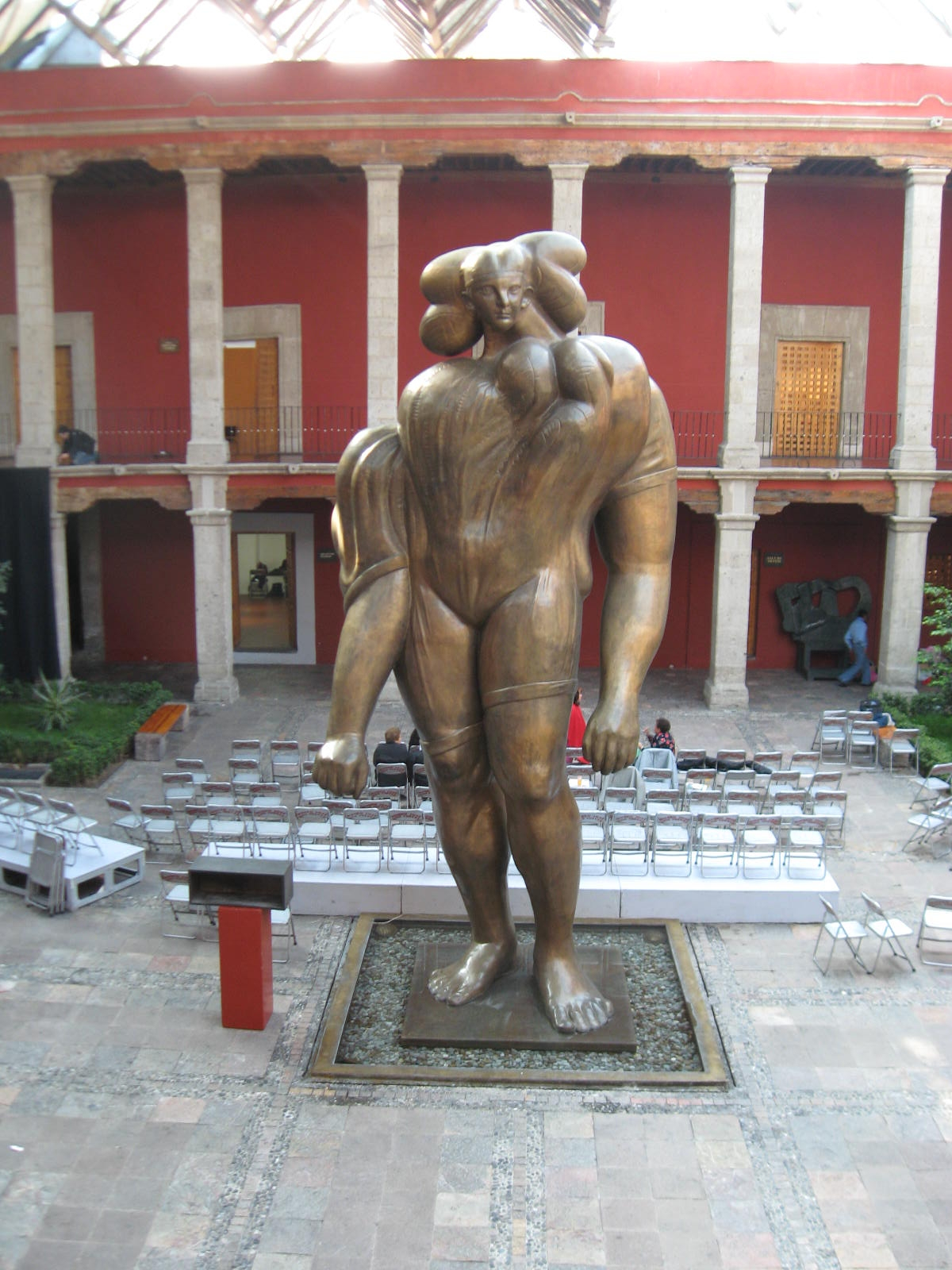
Courtyard of the José Luis Cuevas Museum with "La Giganta"

The José Luis Cuevas Museum is located just off the city's main plaza, or Zócalo, in a building that was the convent for the neighboring Church of Santa Ines (Agnes of Rome). This convent was founded in 1600 by Don Diego Caballero and his wife Doña Inés de Velasco. The convent existed until 1861, when, due to the Nationalization of Church Property Act, all convents and monasteries in the country were disbanded. The convent's church and residence hall where separated and the Church of Santa Inés still maintains its original function. The residence hall became private property, functioning mostly as tenements until artist José Luis Cuevas bought the property with the intention to restoring it and establishing the current museum dedicated to his art and art of contemporary Latin America.

The House of the First Print Shop in the Americas at the corner of Moneda and Licenciado Primo Verdad streets was the home of the first printing press/print shop in the New World. The house was originally constructed by Gerónimo de Aguilar in 1524 and is located on the outer edge of what was the sacred precinct of the Templo Mayor prior to the Conquest.

- Cathedral Nuestra Señora de Balvanera and Sanctuary of San Charbel, built in the 17th century located at Rep Uruguay and Correo Mayor.
- Palacio_de_la_Autonomía de UNAM, (Palace of UNAM's Autonomy) located off of Moneda Street.
- Departamento de Estadistica Nacional (Dept. of National Statistics) building on Correo Mayor

== Around the Alameda Central ==
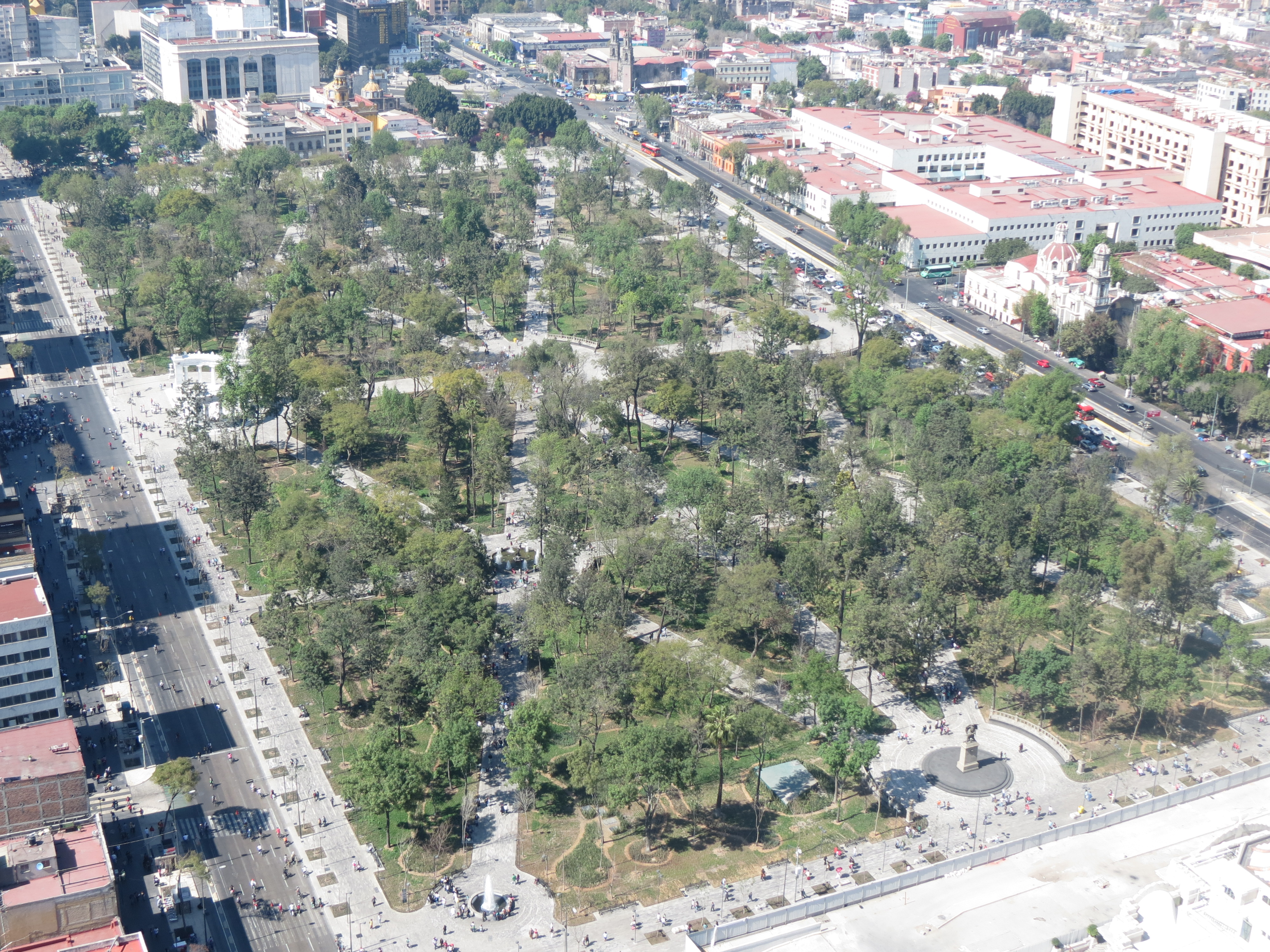
View of the Alameda Central from the Torre Latinoamericana

Alameda Central is a public park adjacent to the Palacio de Bellas Artes, between Juarez Avenue and Hidalgo Avenue. It is a green garden with paved paths and decorative fountains and statues, and is frequently the center of civic events. The area used to be an Aztec marketplace and after the Conquest, the Catholic Church used the area for the burning of heretics and witches. The park was created in 1592, when Viceroy Luis de Velasco decided to create green space here as a public park. The name comes from the Spanish word álamo, which means poplar tree, which were planted here. By the late 19th century, the park included a bandstand and gas (now electric) lamps. On the south side of the park, facing toward the street is the Hemiciclo a Juárez, which is a large white semi-circular monument to Benito Juárez, who is one of Mexico's most beloved presidents.

- Palacio de Bellas Artes on Juárez Street
- Teatro Hidalgo on Hidalgo Street north of the Alameda Central
- Parish of Santa Cruz, Mexico City on Hidalgo Street
- Museo Nacional de la Estampa (National Print Museum) located on Hidalgo Street
- Franz Mayer Museum on Hidalgo Street
- Parish of La Santa Vera Cruz de San Juan de Dios on Hidalgo Street
- Ex Temple of Corpus Christi on Juarez Street

== Barrio Chino ==
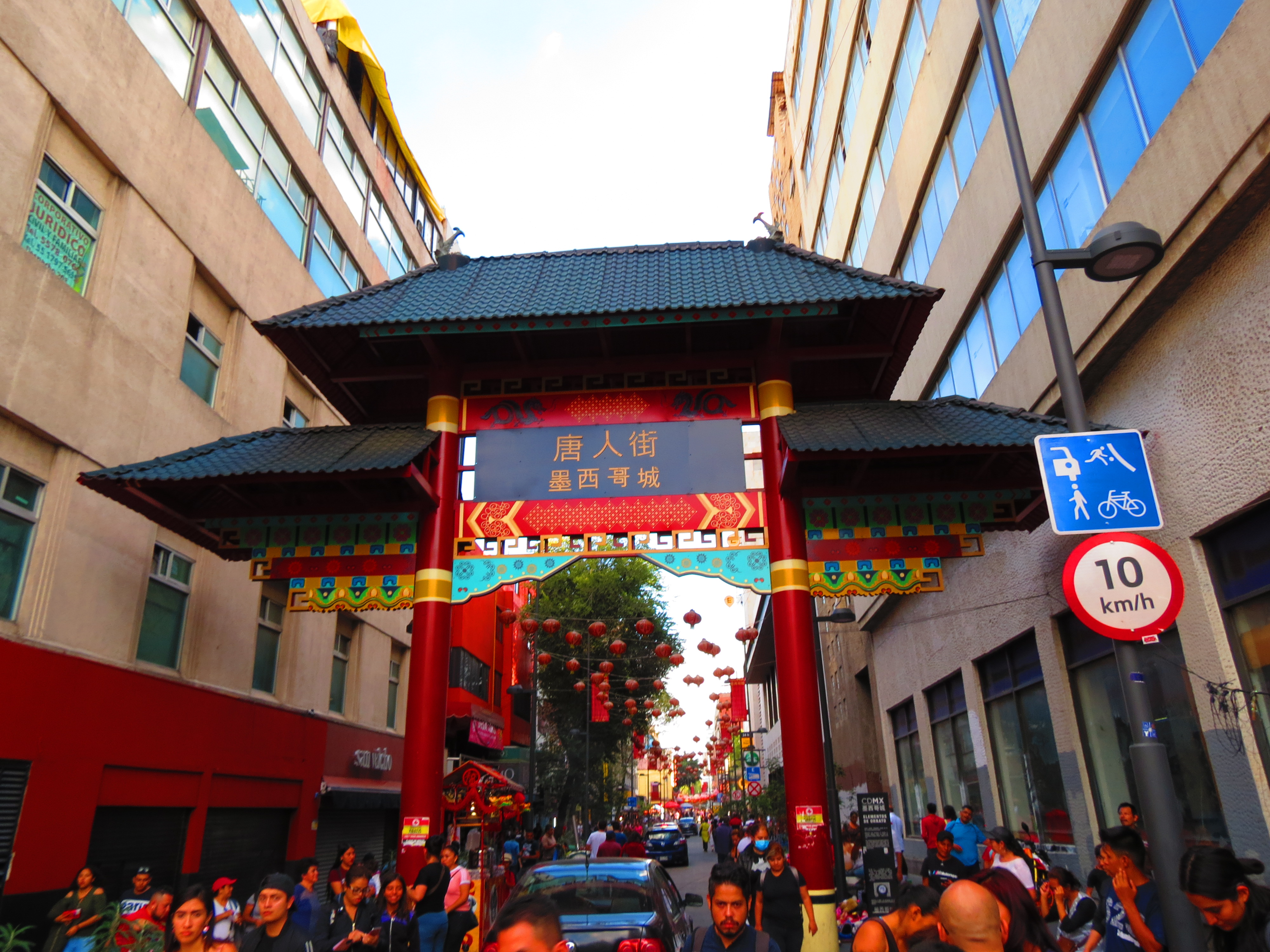
Main entrance to the Barrio Chino

Mexico City's Chinatown, known locally as "Barrio Chino", is located on two blocks of Dolores Street, just south of the Palacio de Bellas Artes. It is very small, consisting only of a number of restaurants and businesses that import goods. Its diminished size is because most descendants of Chinese immigrants to Mexico in the late 19th and early 20th centuries either intermarried with the local Mexican population and/or were expelled from the country in the 1930s. Despite this, it is considered the nucleus of the approximately 3,000 families with Chinese heritage in the city.

== Architecture ==
Even though Spanish colonial buildings make up most of Centro histórico there are examples of different architectural styles

- Baroque: Palacio de Iturbide, Casa de los Azulejos, Palacio Nacional and Palacio de los Condes de Valparaíso
- Neoclassical: Palacio de Mineria
- Italiante style: Palacio de Correos
- Art Nouveau: Palacio de Bellas Artes, Gran Hotel Ciudad de México (built as El Centro Mercantil department store, opened by Barcelonnette emigrants)
- Beaux-Arts: Museo Nacional de Arte, Banco de México
- Art Deco Banco de Mexico, Interior of Palacio de Bellas Artes
- Functionalist: Torre Latinoamericana

== Education ==
Primary and secondary schools:

- Colegio de San Ignacio de Loyola Vizcaínas

== 20th and 21st centuries ==
=== Deterioration of the area ===
From Aztec times, the Centro Historico used to be where the wealthy and elite lived. However, in the early 20th century, these classes began to move to areas west and southwest of the Centro, to neighbourhoods such as Colonia Juárez, Colonia Cuauhtémoc, Colonia Roma and Colonia Condesa. The Centro remained the commercial, political and intellectual center through the mid 20th century although it was around this time that UNAM moved most of its facilities to the new Ciudad Universitaria. The reason for the decline of the city center was partly man-made and partly natural. In the 1940s, the city government froze rents so that until 1998 when the government repealed the law, tenants were still paying 1950s-level rents. With no financial incentive to keep up their properties, landlords let their buildings disintegrate. The 1985 earthquake took its toll on a number of these structures, which were never fixed or rebuilt, leading to slums and garbage-strewn vacant lots. The result was the loss of about 100,000 residents of the "Colonia Centro", leaving the area almost deserted at night.

By the 1980s, so many had fled the Centro that many of its former mansions were either abandoned or turned into tenements for the poor, and its sidewalks and streets taken over by pickpockets and milling vendors. For many people, especially international visitors, Mexico City's reputation for pollution, traffic and crime has made the city someplace to "get into and out of as fast as you can", seeing it as little more than an airport through which to make their connecting flights to resort areas like Cozumel. Until recently, many of the restaurants in the area, even the best, would close early to allow employees time to get home because the area was not particularly safe at night.

=== Deterioration of religious buildings ===
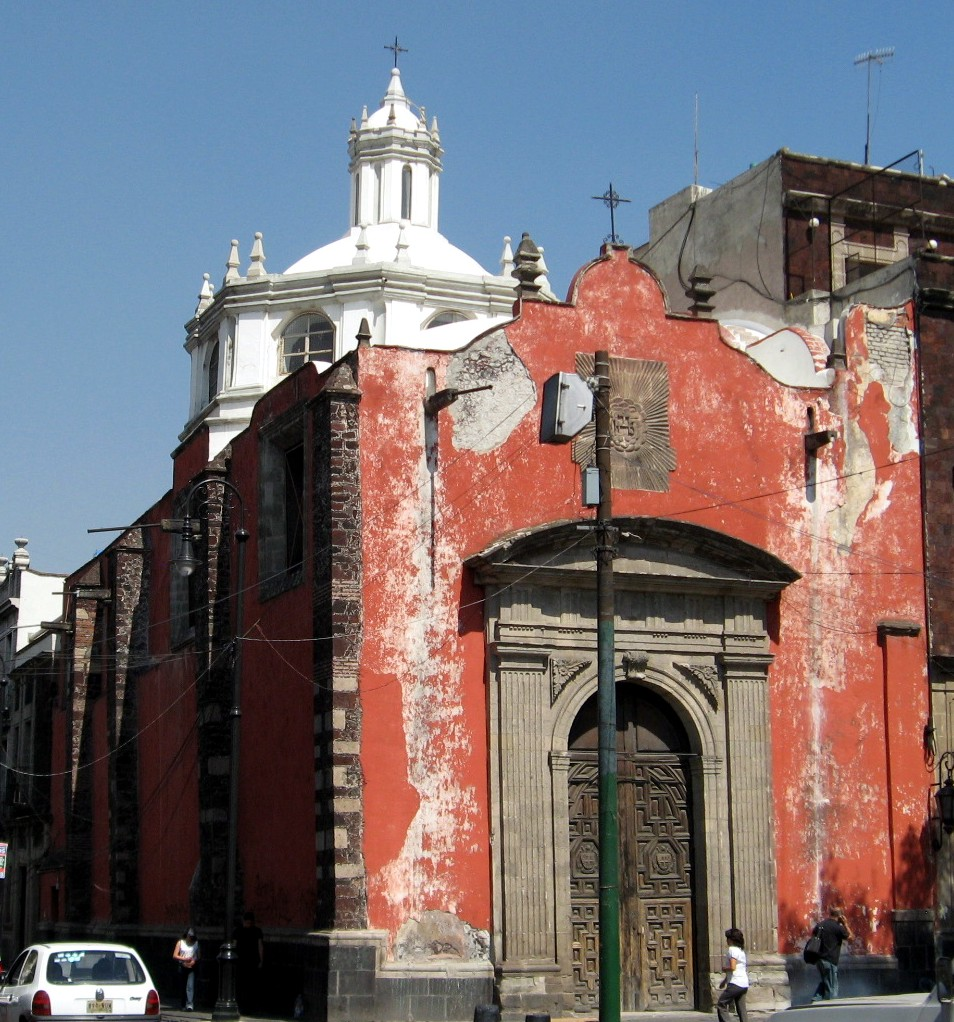
Church of San Lorenzo

Many of the historic churches in the oldest parts of the city are in serious disrepair and are in danger of being lost. Efforts to save these churches are hampered by disagreements between the Church and the federal government. Because these churches are both active religious institutions and historical landmarks, their legal situation is complicated. By law, religious institutions cannot appeal to the government for financial help, but agencies like the National Council for Culture and Arts (CONACULTA) do have say in how these places are maintained because of their historic value.

Some of the disagreement is over the extent of the deterioration. Conaculta does not believe that any of the 68 religious buildings in the oldest part of the city are in imminent danger of collapse. However the Archdiocese of Mexico believes that the structural problems noted constitute a grave danger to both people and to the "incalculable artistic and historic value of the buildings." One of the churches in imminent danger is called San Lorenzo Diácono y Mártir, with Our Lady of Loreto, La Santísima Trinidad and La Santa Cruz also requiring prompt attention to avoid collapse. The San Lorenzo and Loreto churches both have had incidents where large pieces of the building, a stone and a window respectively, have fallen, causing damage but no injuries. Despite efforts by the archdiocese to demonstrate the extent of the damage of many of the churches, Conaculta still maintains that none of the buildings are in danger of coming down. Another problem is that the depopulation of the historic center, which leaves these churches fairly empty and the diocese unable to fund restoration work.

=== Revitalization ===
Starting in the early 2000s, the government has infused 500 million Mexican pesos (US$55 million) into the Historic Center Trust and entered into a partnership with the Fundación Centro Histórico, an organization established by Carlos Slim, to buy dozens of centuries-old buildings for rehabilitation. The significance of this effort was recognized when, in 2006, the Historic Center was included in the 2006 World Monuments Watch by the World Monuments Fund. Work began with the beautification of 34 blocks just north of the Zócalo, digging up the antiquated drainage system and improving water supply. An architect was put in charge of each of the thirteen main streets to restore the façades of more than 500 buildings. The latest infrastructure projects of this type have focused on the southwest portions of the area, on República de El Salvador, Talavera, Correo Mayor, Mesones and Pino Suárez streets, mostly focusing on repaving and improving the outdated drainage systems. In the process, artifacts dating from as early as the pre-Hispanic period have been unearthed.

All over the historic center, streets have been pedestrianized, buildings have been restored, and new museums opened. In the 1990s, after many years of controversy, protests and even riots, most street vendors were evicted to other parts of the city. The impetus to bring things back to the city center included the construction of the new mayoral residence just off the Zócalo. The government has buried electric and telephone cables in the area, and replaced old asphalt with paving stones. It has also installed nearly 100 security cameras to help with crime issues. This paved the way for the opening of upscale eateries, bars and fashionable stores. Also, young people are moving into downtown lofts. To attract more tourists, there are new red double-decker buses.

As of 2004, investment in the city center has climbed to over 5 billion pesos or 438 million U.S. dollars. According to the Historic Center of Mexico City Trust, this has led to the creation of 15,000 jobs and property owners in the area are showing interest in improving on their investments here. It has also attracted outside investment into the area.

== Transportation ==
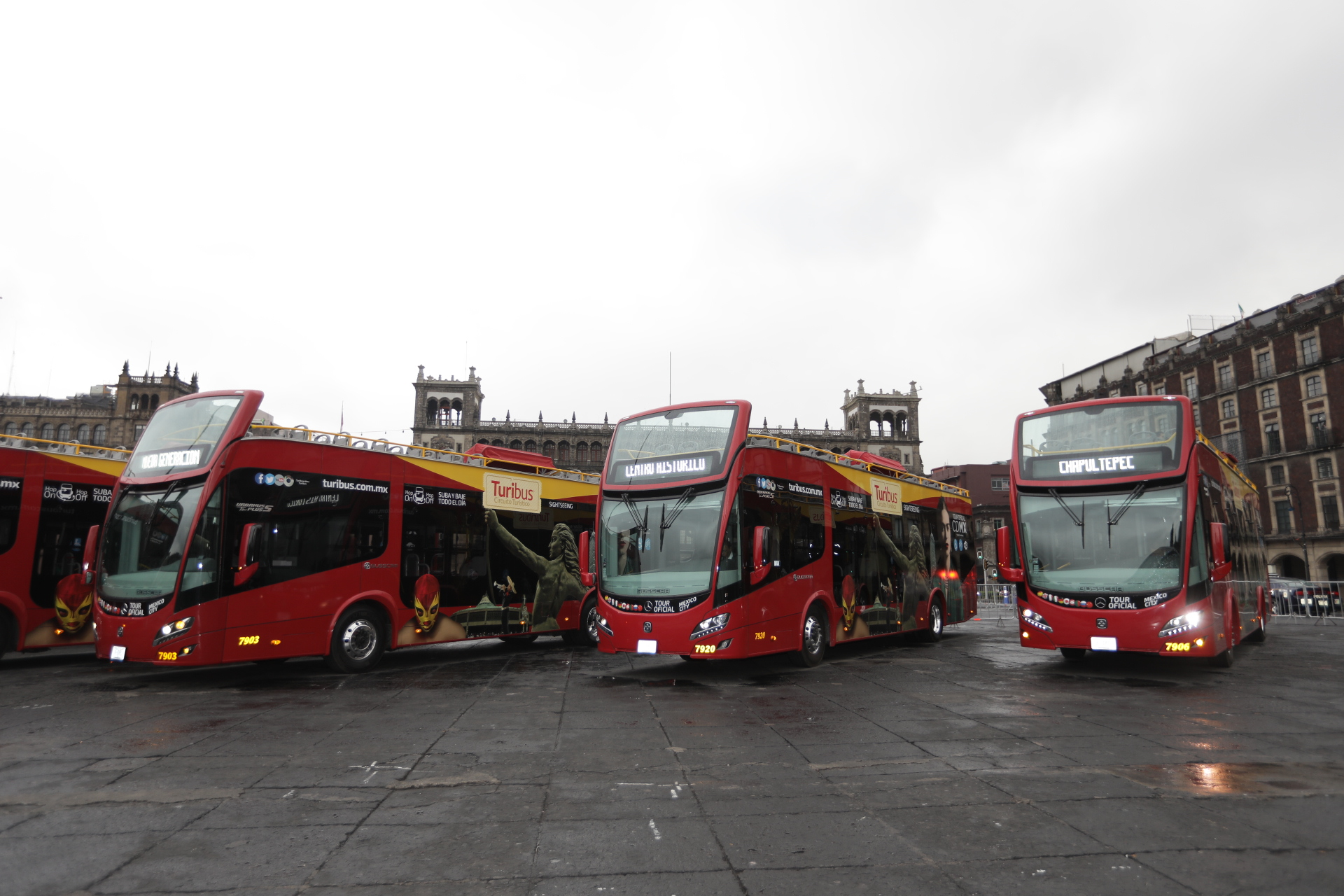
Turibus in the historical center

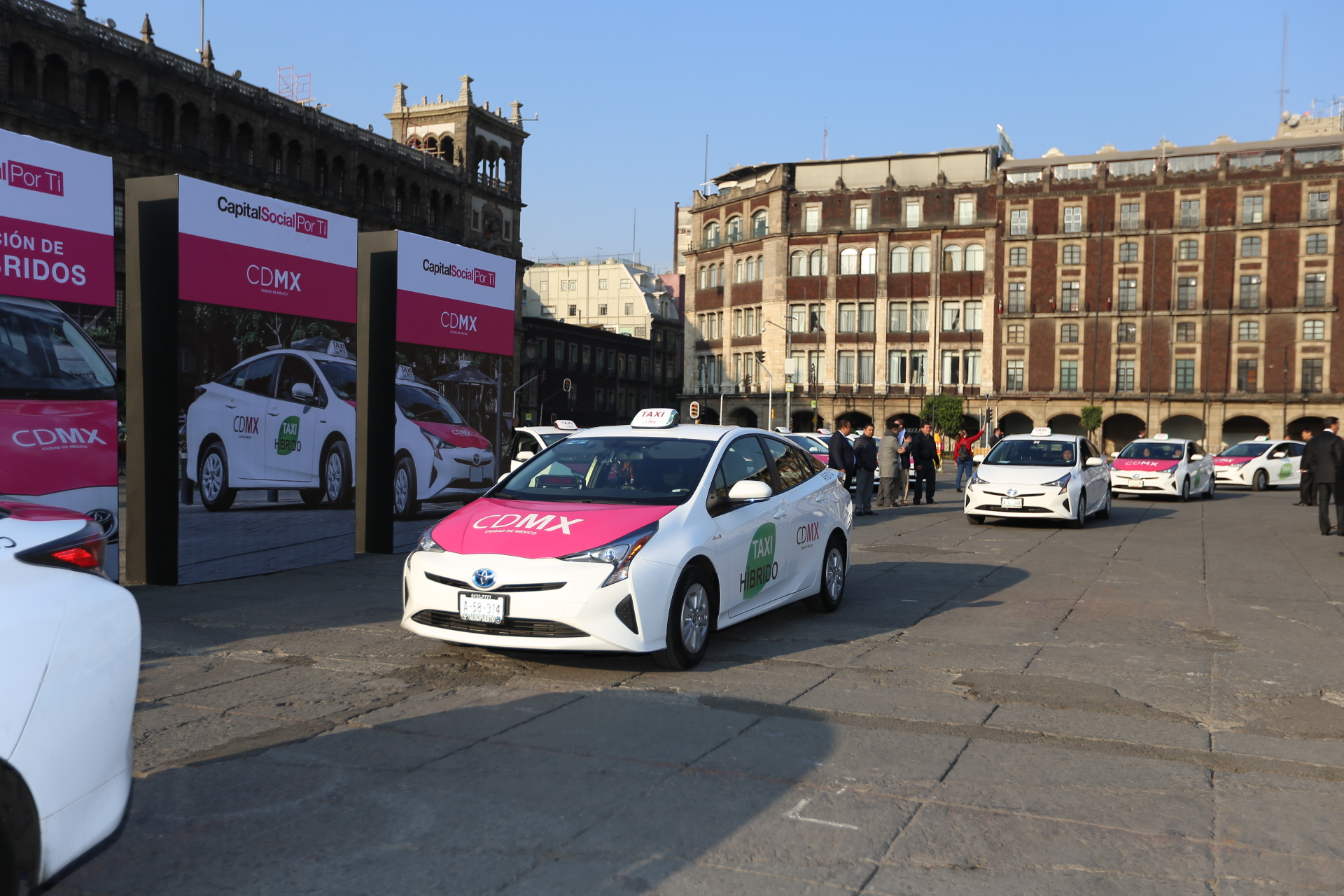
Mexico City Taxis

Tour buses, locally known as "Turibuses", are the most commonly used transportation for tourism in the historical center as well as many other parts of the city. This is a paid service which transports visitors to different tourist attractions and cultural points in the city center. The Mexico City Metro is the most commonly used means of transport for locals to visit the spaces of the historic center. The area is serviced by several stations. The Zócalo is served by Zócalo/Tenochtitlan metro station; Allende station the northern zone; Bellas Artes, Hidalgo and Juárez stations cover the Alameda area; and San Juan de Letrán, Salto del Agua, Isabel la Católica, Pino Suárez and Merced stations cover the southern zones. The Mexico City Metrobús service also covers the zone with the Line 4 route. Another commonly used form of transportation is the taxi service. These are regulated by the Mexico City government and can be summoned by the government app "Mi Taxi". Cycle rickshaws, known in Mexico as "ciclotaxi" (English for cycle taxi) were a commonly used means of transport to visit the spaces of the historic center, however their usage decreased significantly in the late 2010s.

== See also ==
- Barrios Mágicos of Mexico City
