= Old Customs Building, Mexico City =

Building in Centro Histórico, Mexico City

Coordinates: 19°26′14.01″N 99°8′0.68″W

Old Customs Building
- Antigua Aduana
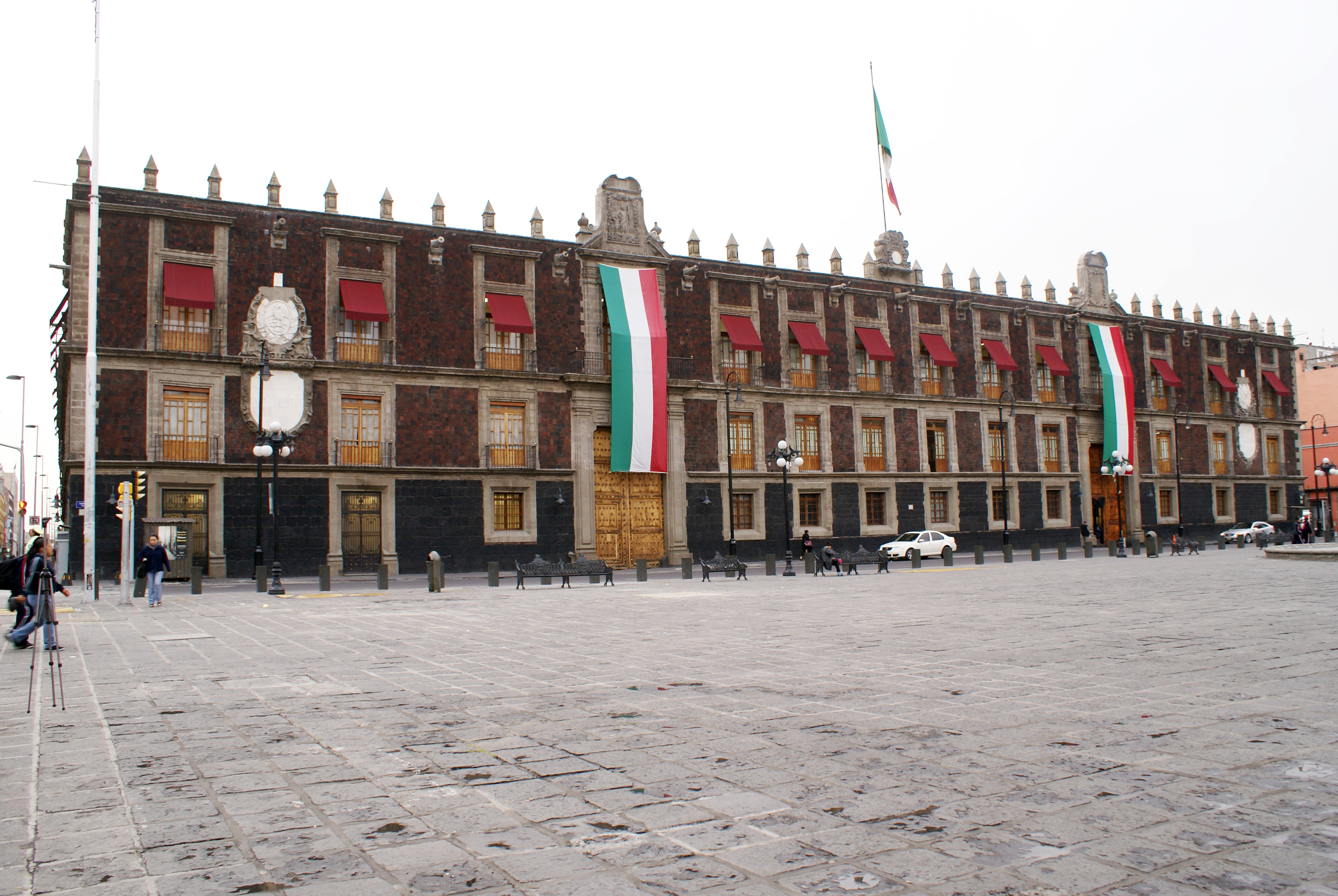
- Facade of the building

General information
- Architectural style: New Spanish Baroque
- Location: República de Brasil #31, Centro Histórico, Mexico City. C.P. 06029
- Construction started: 1729
- Completed: 1735
- Owner: Secretariat of Public Education

The Old Customs Building is located on the east side of Santo Domingo Plaza between Republica de Venezuela and Luis Gonzalez Obregon Streets just to the north of the main plaza of Mexico City. The land here originally belonged to several nobles, including the Marquis of Villamayor. The Royal Customs office was in charge of the regulation of imported merchandise into New Spain and taxing the same, becoming the largest source of revenue for the government.

The office originally was on 5 de febrero Street but was moved into the Villamayor house in 1676 because of its location next to Santo Domingo Plaza. Eventually, the government bought the house and rebuilt it in 1730, which is the building that survives today. Eventually, the Customs office in Mexico City closed and it was taken over by the Secretariat of Public Education in the early part of the 20th century. It remains as offices of this government agency.

== History of the site ==
The land on the east side of Santo Domingo Plaza was given to Captain Don Cristobal de Oñate, Gonzalo de Salazar and the Marquis of Villamayor soon after the Conquest on which all built residences. As the colony of New Spain developed, foreign trade, especially with the Philippines, other Spanish colonies and Spain itself became a fundamental branch of the economy and the main source of tax income for the Crown, making the Royal Customs Office an important institution from the colonial period until the 19th century. In addition, this office began collecting sales taxes for the colony starting in 1558. It was originally located on 5 de febrero Street and was there until 1676, when it was moved to the houses of the Marquis of Villamayor. This family rented the property to the government for 400 pesos a year while they lived in Spain.

This property had been greatly damaged by the flood in 1629, which had made 75% of the buildings in the city uninhabitable for some time. Despite its condition, the site was chosen because of its space and location next to Santo Domingo Plaza, which provided a place for people to wait. This was especially important during times when goods from galleons arriving from Spain or the Philippines arrived into the city. In the late 1680s to early 1690s, permission was sought and gained from King Carlos II to purchase the Villamayor property. At the time, it was in the name of Francisca Maria Bellvis, Marquesa of Benvides and Villamayor, as the titleholder of the land grant established by Don Francisco de Pacheco y Vocanegra. She held it for her son, Joseph Vicente Bellvis y Moncada, Marquis de Belgia who was living in Valencia. Seeing the inevitability of the sale, she agree to accept. the sum of 29,186 pesos for the property.

In 1723, it was estimated that the cost of rebuilding the house would be about 40,000 pesos, and Pedro Arrieta was put in charge of the project. Construction of the building, which survives to this day, began in 1729, and finished in 1731. The nuns of La Encarnación convent next door were opposed to this project. They had wanted to buy the land themselves. They also were worried that the larger building with expanded storage facilities would attract thieves and block sunlight on their property. Structural problems with the new construction started soon after it was completed. Today, only the exterior, the main stairs and the patios columns are originals with the rest eventually replaces under a number of repairs. Also from the time of the Royal Customs Office was located, traffic along Santo Domingo Plaza had increased dramatically. The new building was designed with two large portals on opposite sides of the building to allow mule teams to enter and exit, but this did little to alleviate the situation. The building was expanded again in 1777 and another round of remodeling work was undertaken in the early 1790s by architect Miguel Constanzó.

After the Mexican War of Independence, the Customs building remained a tax collection center although it was reorganized in 1825. In 1887, President Porfirio Diaz held a grand banquet and ball here to celebrate his third term in office. The building was decorated with carpets, tropical plants, bronze sculptures, fountains and colored lights. However, shortly after this, internal customs fees were abolished and later this building would house the Federal District Treasury. This led to the building's current name, which is “Vieja Aduana” or Old Customs.

Due to the continued growth of the Secretariat of Public Education in the early 20th century, the old Customs building was annexed to the agency along with a number of adjoining houses. This is how all of the buildings on this block came to be joined together, in the 1930s. About ten years later, David Alfaro Siqueiros painted the main stairwell. The building saw another round of restoration and remodeling work by Jorge Medellin in 1991.

== Description of the current building ==
The building is of a fairly simple design. The facade is of tezontle, a dark red porous volcanic stone, with doorways, windows and balconies of cantera, a white stone. Inside there are two large interior patios with large columns. The main stairwell contains mural work by Siqueiros called “Patricios y Patricidas” (Patricians and Patricides), which was begun in the mid-1940s but was never finished.
