= Saint Augustine House =

Coordinates: 19°25′48.58″N 99°8′5.43″W

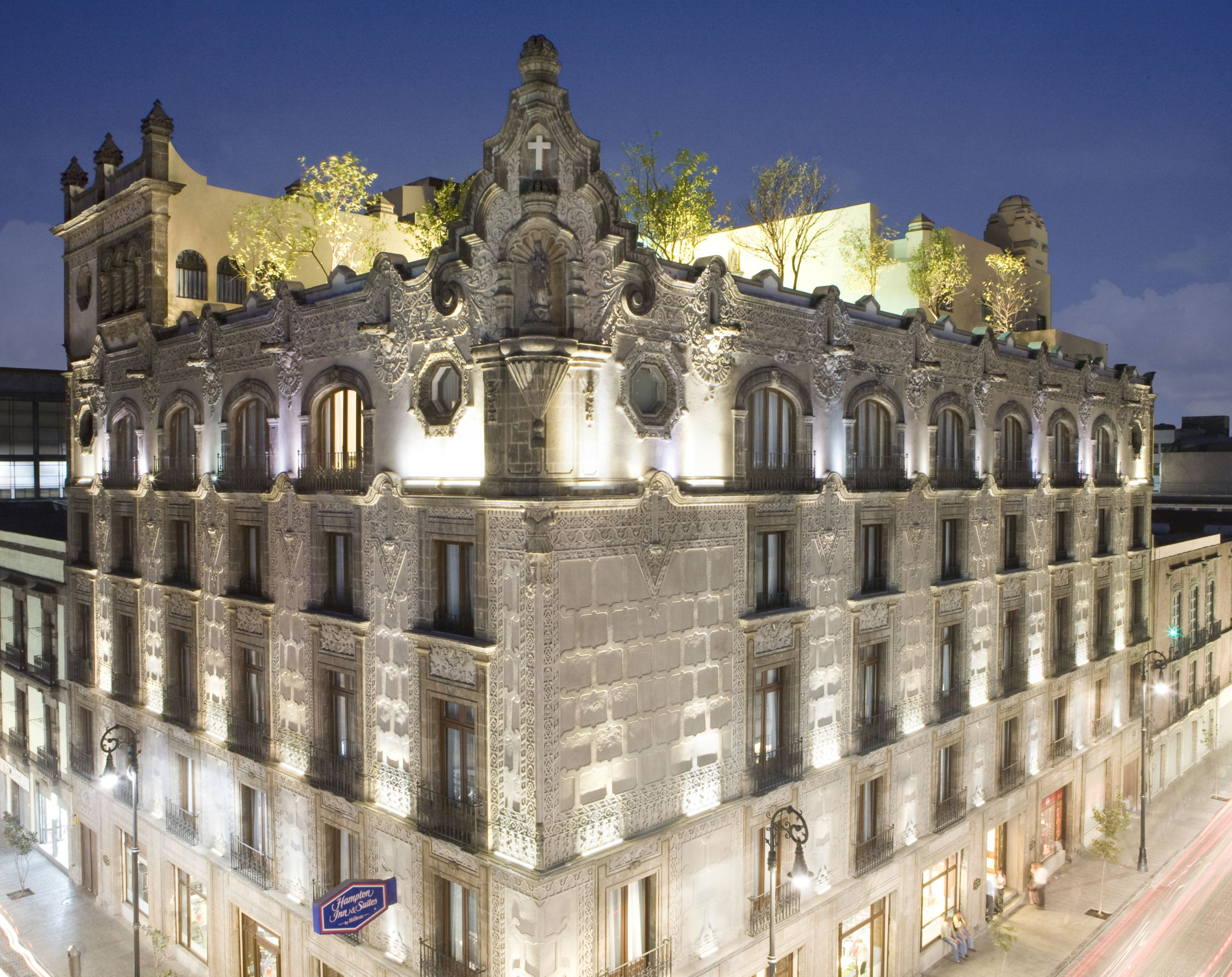
A view of the house in 2009, after its conversion to a Hampton Inns Hotel

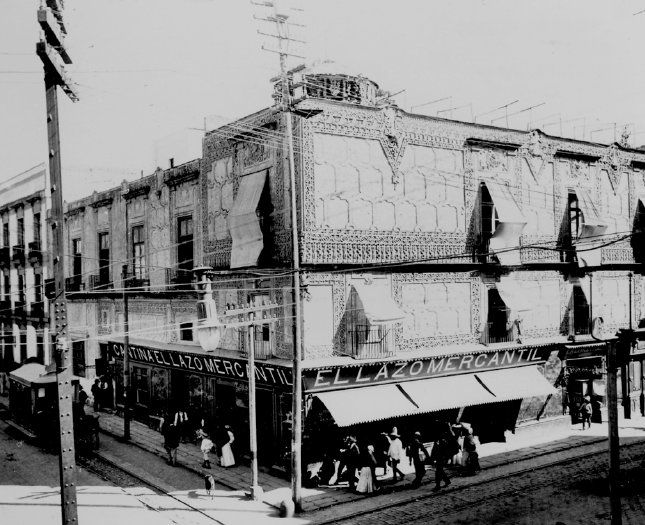
The house in 1905

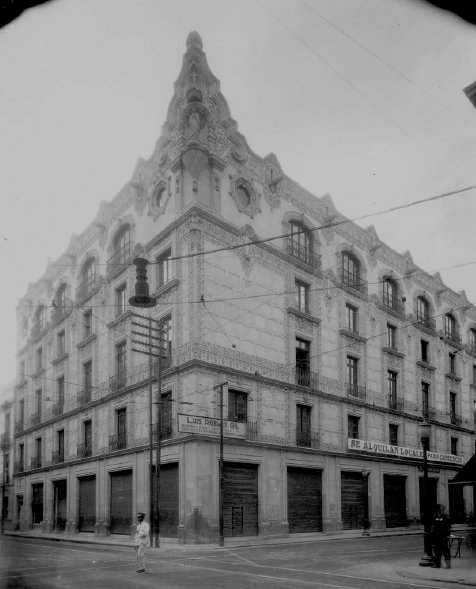
The house in 1928 after being remodelated

The Saint Augustine House is a landmark building located in the Historic center of Mexico City, on the corner of the streets Republic of Uruguay and 5 of February, (previously streets of Don Juan Manuel and la Joya respectively).

It got its name as it was property of the order of the Augustinians, whose convent was located next to this building.

== History ==
The order of the Augustinians owned several properties in the colonial Mexico City, besides the convent the Augustinians, including: the College of San Pablo (present day Juárez Hospital), the Hacienda of Santa Monica (in Tlalnepantla), the hostel of Santo Tomas de Villanueva (present day boutique hotel), the hostel of San Nicolas de Tolentino (present day property of the UNAM), the novitiate and its chapel (on Republic of El Salvador street), besides several houses in the area of the historic center of Mexico City.

Colonial period

The exact date of the construction of the San Agustín House is not known. The oldest photographs of the building are from the late 19th century, but the building was built at the end of the 17th century or the beginning of the 18th century during the colonial period of New Spain. It has typical elements of the domestic architecture of that period. The main characteristic of the facade are the ajaracas, a Moorish style decoration that consists of mortar lines interlaced to each other forming figures. Those of Saint Augustine house are one of the very few examples of colonial ajaracas that are conserved in the historic center of Mexico City.

20th century

In 1924, the building was fully remodelled and 3 floors were added in Spanish Colonial Revival style, with arches, gargoyles and sculpture of the Virgin of Guadalupe while the interior was decorated with thousands of talavera tiles and iron forged handrails.

In the mid 1930s the roof of the building was adapted as a terrace in order to house a rooftop restaurant. At that time the Art Deco style was popular in Mexico City, and its influence can be appreciated in some details of the terrace like the geometrized battlements and the two small domes.

Hotel

After 1928 the building lodged the Hotel Ontario, which worked until the 1980s, when the zone was deteriorated as a result of the earthquake of 1985 and the operation of the hotel was no longer viable. After that the building remained semi abandoned, with small offices and stores and even a night club in the mid nineties, until its full renovation to lodge a Hampton Inn and Suites hotel that opened since December 2008.
