= La Santísima Church =

Church in Mexico City, Mexico

Coordinates: 19°25′59.37″N 99°7′36.7″W

- La Santísima Church
- Country: Mexico
- Denomination: Roman Catholic

Architecture
- Architectural type: Baroque

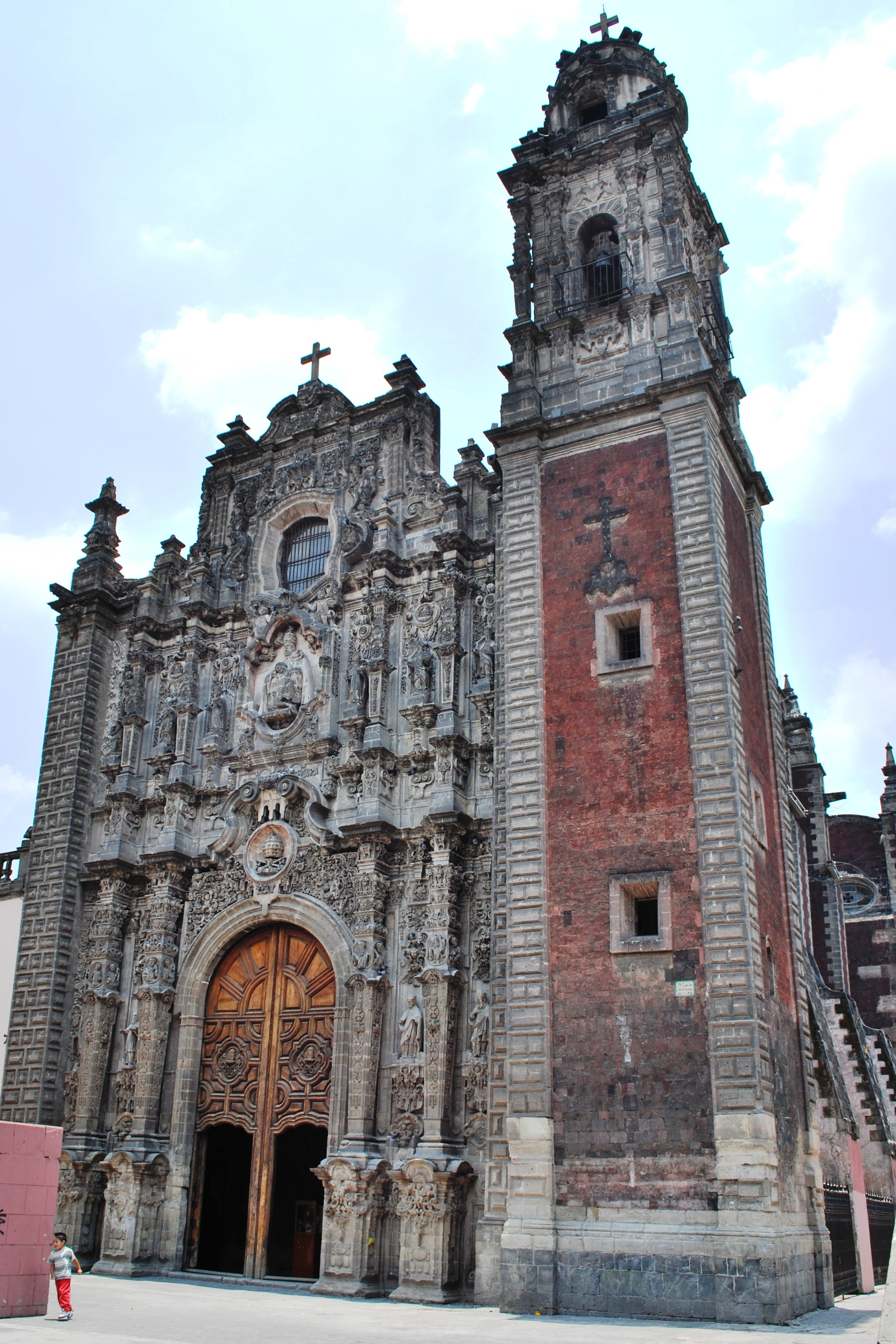
Façade of the church

La Santísima Church is located 12 La Santísima Street at corner of Emiliano Zapata Street in the historic center of Mexico City. Its full name is Church and Hospital of the Most Holy Trinity (Templo y Antiguo Hospital de la Santisíma Trinidad) . The church was built between 1755 and 1783 as a temple for the adjoining hospital/hospice for priests. The hospital functioned until 1859, when the Reform Laws nationalized much of Church's property in Mexico. The church still retains its original function but the adjoining hospital and office sites have since moved into private hands with only parts of the original structures still intact and preserved.

== Description ==
=== The church ===
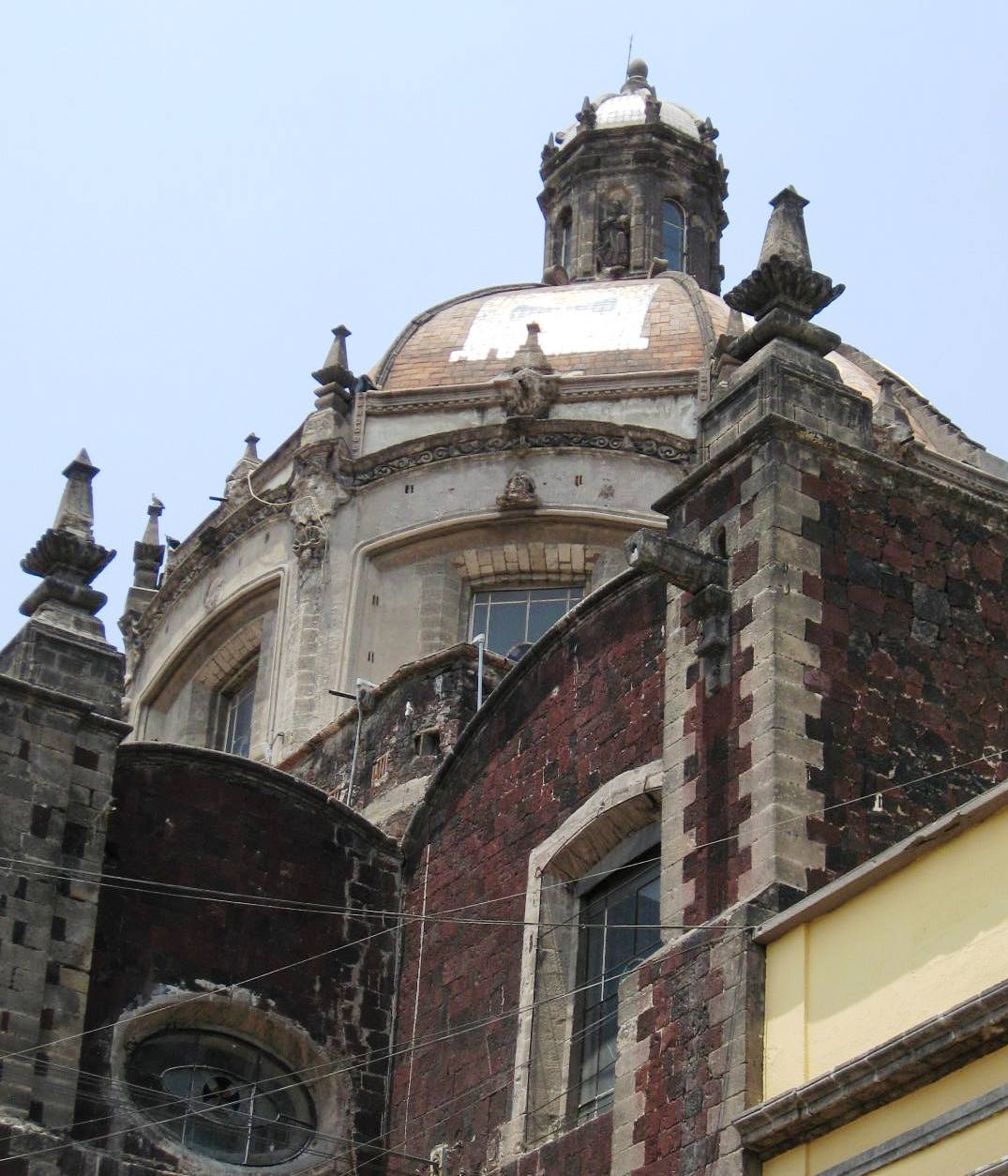
Dome of the church with Maltese cross

The church building consists of three naves with the center one being significantly wider than the side ones. Its architectural style is similar to the Tabernacle of the Mexico City Cathedral. Because of this, many consider this church to be the work of the same architect, Lorenzo Rodriguez. However, this is in dispute because some elements that are common in Rodriguez's other works are lacking here, and some records indicate that architect Ildefonso Iniesta Bejarano was involved in the project. The dome outside is decorated with tiles forming Maltese crosses, a symbol of the Trinitarians. The basic floor plan is that of a Latin cross, common to churches in the 17th and 18th centuries. It has a vaulted roof of eight sides which reaches to a central point, containing windows for lighting. The church is of the profusely decorated Baroque style, but some areas, like the roof are relatively unadorned.

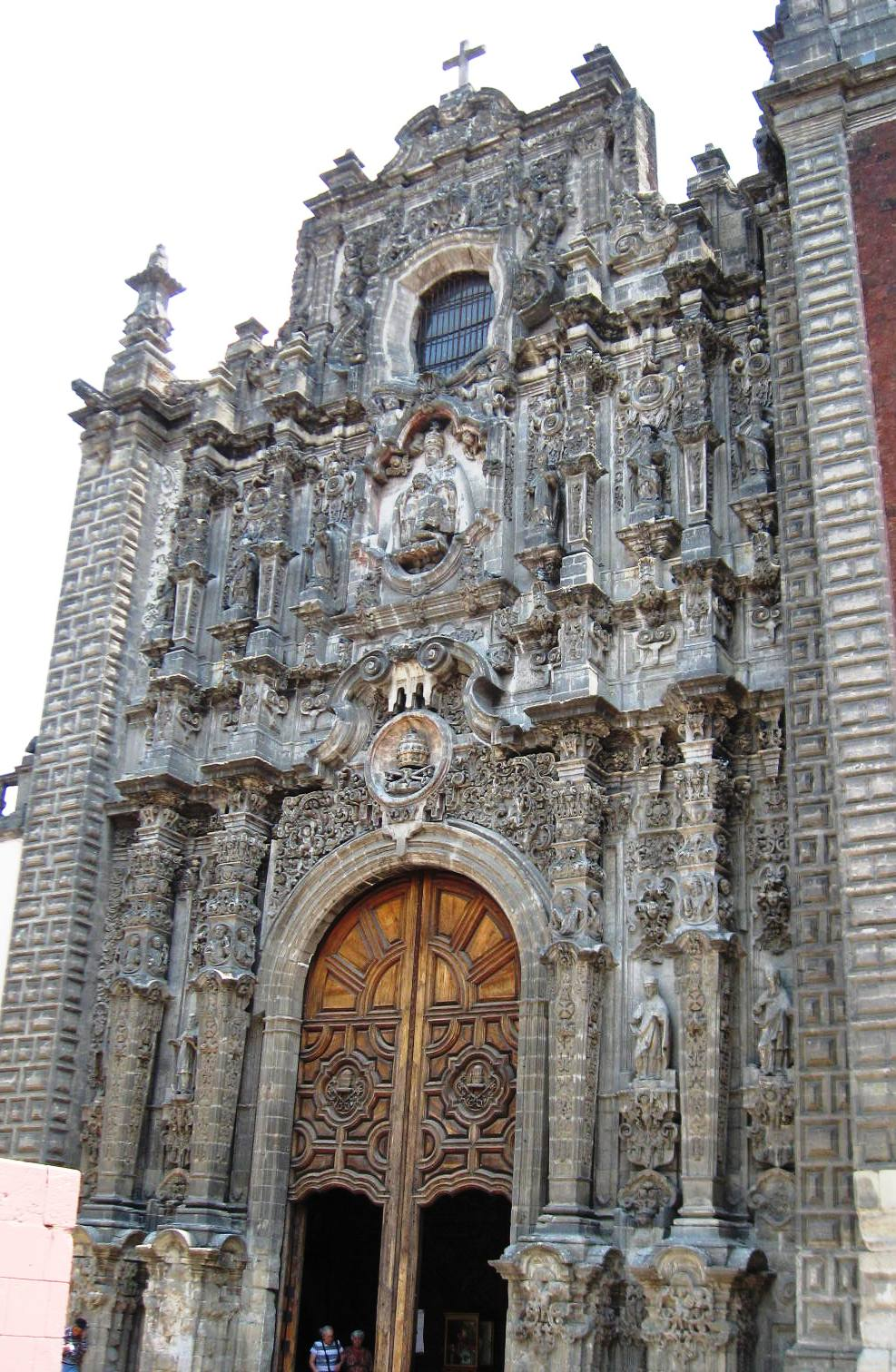
Main portal of the church

The main façade contains some aspects of the older churches that surround it, such as the cross layout, the relief work and window of the chorus, although new aspects such as estipite columns were introduced. The façade also contains twelve medallions done in relief, each representing an apostle. Among the columns there are ten sculptures, five of which represent bishops, four represent popes and one represents a priest, each of which are identified as learned scholars of the Church. The main portal is Churrigueresque style worked in "chiluca", a hard gray stone and flanked by two pillars. The keystone of the central arch of this entrance is decorated with a medallion with the papal coat-of-arms covered by a series of volutes. Above this, there is a relief depicting the Holy Trinity with God the Father dressed as a pope. The depiction of the Trinity is due to the church's patronage by a Trinitarian brotherhood originally formed by tailors.

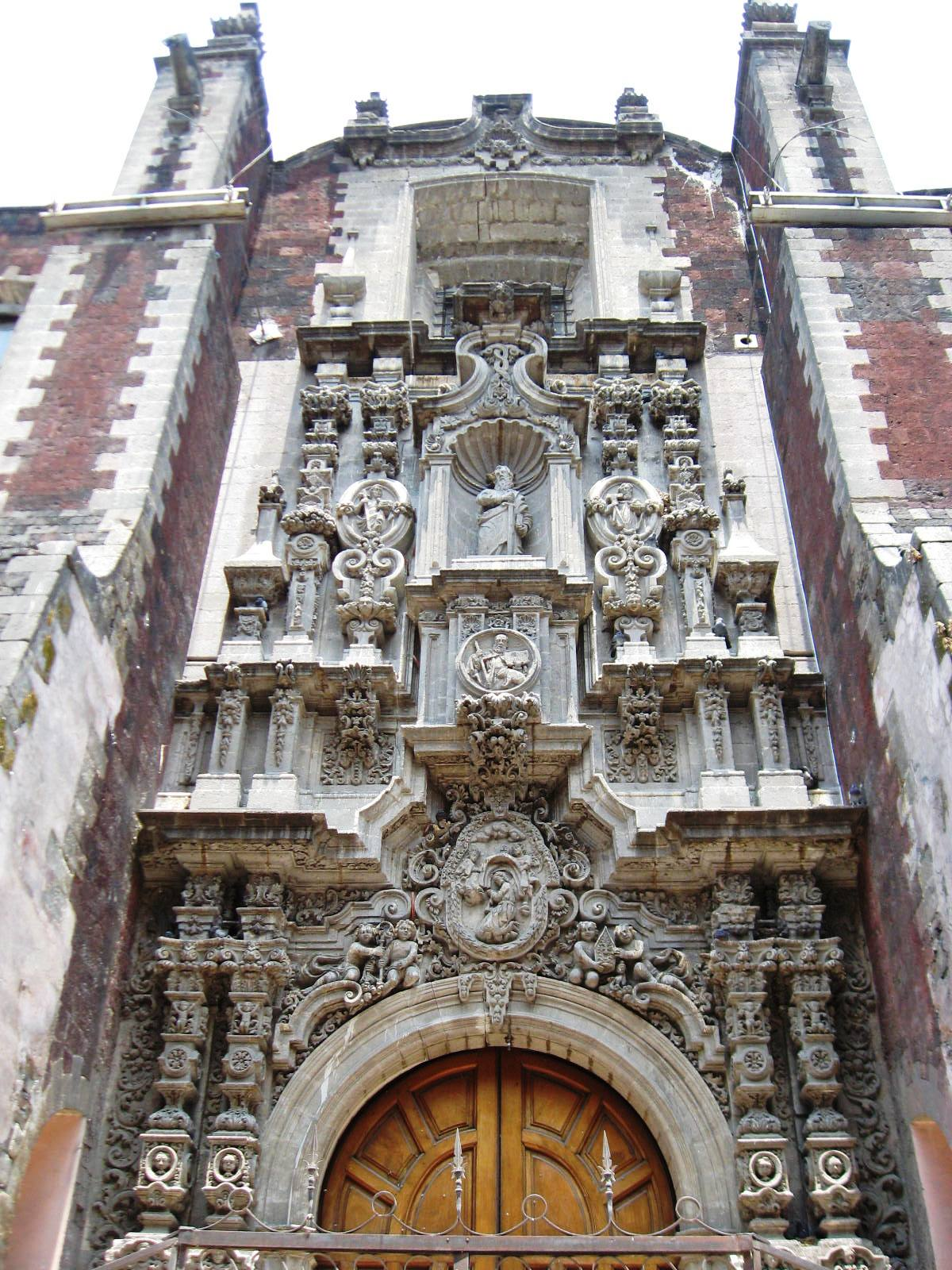
Side portal of church

The side entrance to the church is also Churrigueresque with estipite columns, with Saint Peter in the central niche, reflecting the complex's other patron, a clerical brotherhood devoted to this saint. In the arch, there is an icon of Ildephonsus of Toledo as well as a medallion with an image of Saint Anthony the Great, who became popular in Mexico at the time the church was built. There are also medallions of John the Baptist and another unidentified saint. This side entrance was also the entrance to the hospital. Both entrances are profusely decorated in the Baroque style, mostly with images of apostles, bishops and scholars accompanied by angels and cherubs.

On the side of the church facing Emiliano Zapata street, there is a niche flanked by small estipite columns. In this niche is a representation of the Corpus Christi, dedicated to the Holy Eucharist. During the colonial period, this was the scene of a major festival in the capital.

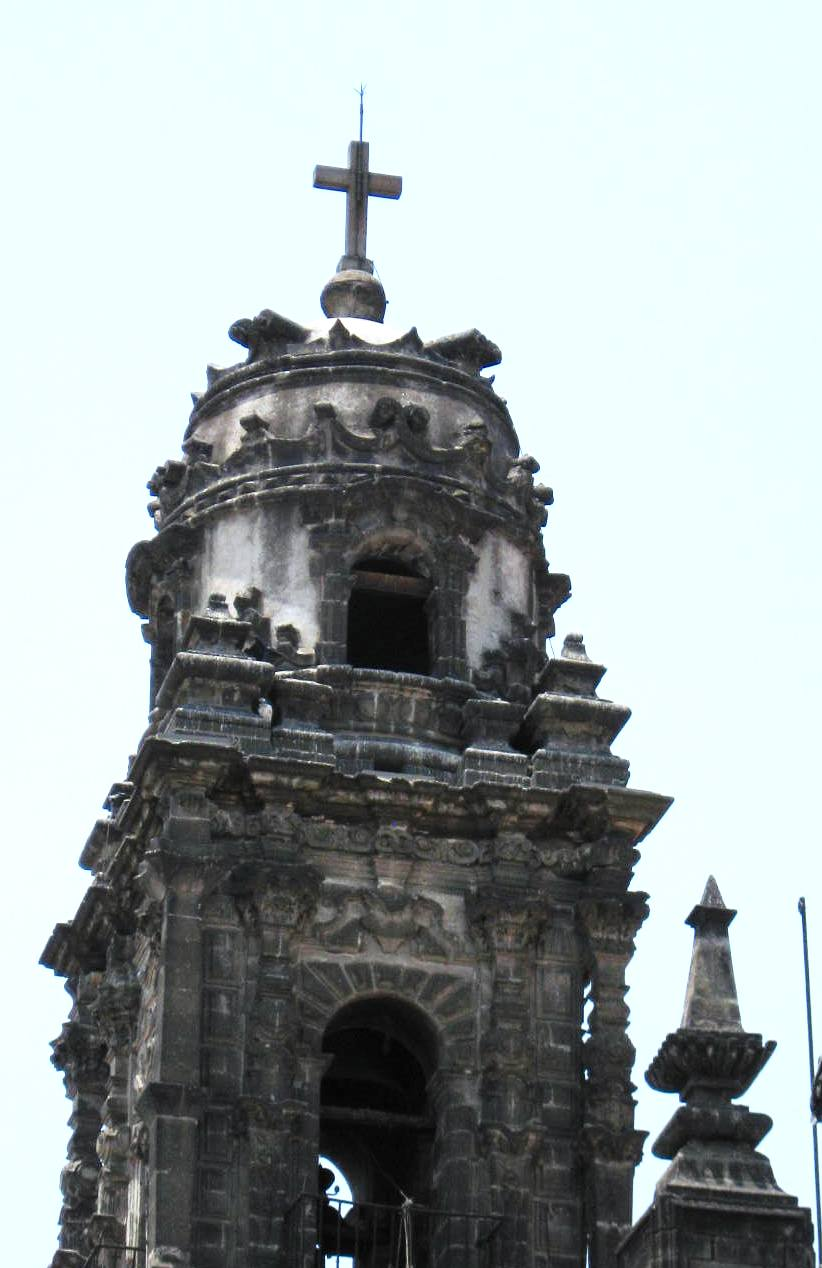
Bell tower of the church shaped like a pontiff's hat

The tower rises to the side of the main façade. It is topped by a very large sculpture of the papal crown, representing the supreme authority of the papacy. It contains estipite columns which were never finished and are unique among churches in Mexico City.

Inside, very little remains of the original church decoration. The church was decorated with artwork and altarpieces with gold leaf but these have disappeared. One thing that remains is the wooden screen that blocks light from entering the main entrance. It is made of cedar decorated with carved geometric figures along with flowers and mermaids. It contains a stained glass window depicting the Holy Trinity. Another is the choir balustrade, also made of cedar and intricately carved with baskets of fruit.

=== The hospital and offices ===
Of the hospital building, only the main cloister remains. While it is private property, it has been restored to conserve much of its historical character. The floor plan of the cloister is rectangular with two floors with arches on the north, south and west sides. These are supported with thick pillars. The building has preserved almost all of its original walls, both inside and out, although some have been modified to accommodate shops and other businesses. Some of the original patio of the hospital is still intact within the restored building as well. Only the front façade of the hospital office remains, located to the north and east of the church. Behind the façade is newer construction.

== History ==
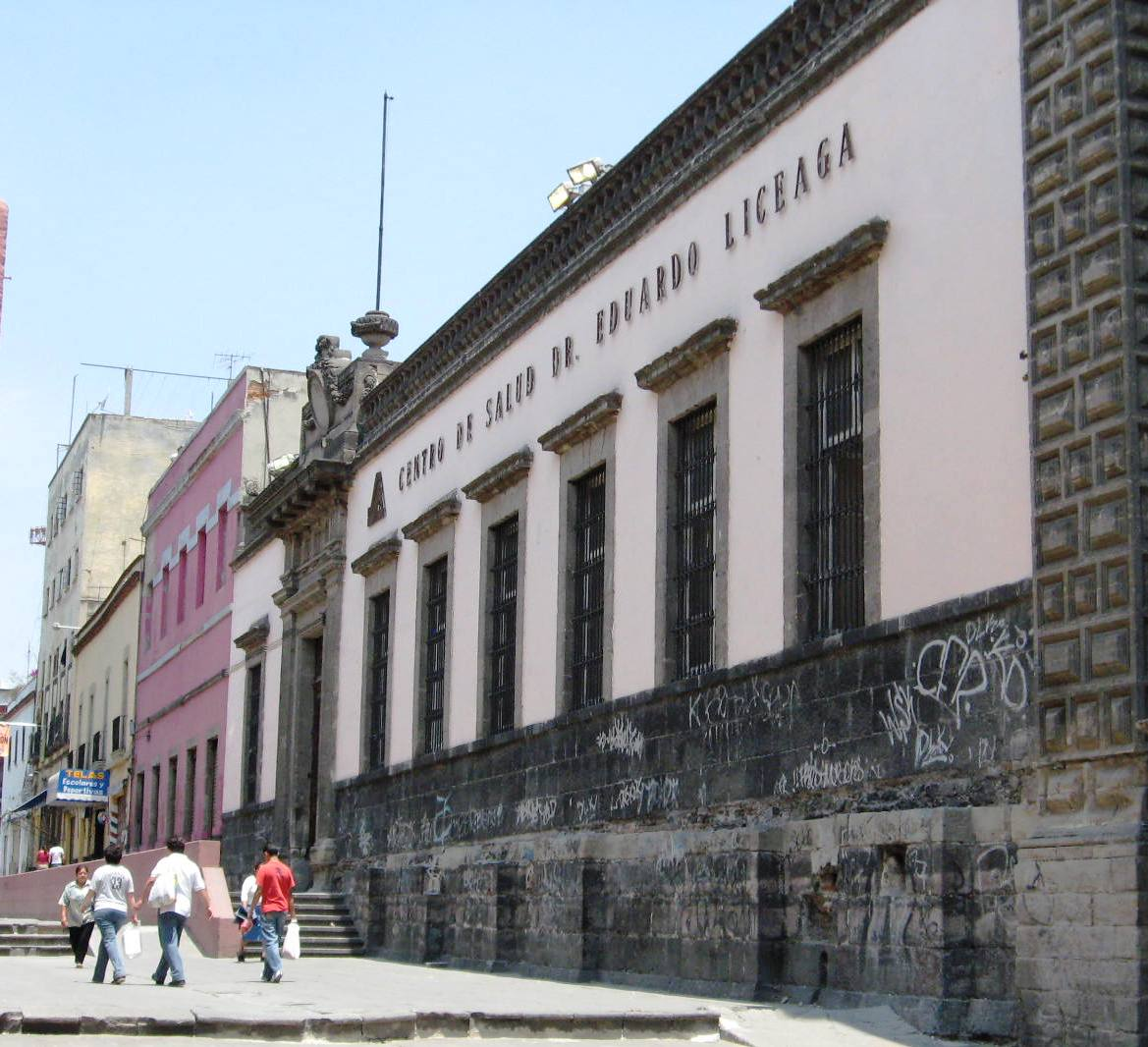
The old hospital building

The origins of the church lie with a small hermitage built in 1526, sponsored by a tailors' guild. In 1567, a group of nuns of the Order of Santa Clara occupied the hermitage, rebuilding the badly decayed building; however they abandoned the site only ten years later. The tailors' guild retook possession of the property and decided to make themselves into a more formal religious organization, affiliated with the Trinitarians. Around the same time in 1577, Pedro Gutierrez Pisa founded the Brotherhood of Saint Peter to establish a hospital–hospice dedicated to ill and old clergy. This clerical organization joined with the Trinitarians to gather the necessary resources, leading to the establishment of the Cofraternity of the Most Holy Trinity (Archicofradía de la Santísima Trinidad) which had four principal missions: bury the dead, visit the sick, evangelize and give lodging to pilgrims.

Building of the first church and hospital began in 1580, but the church was not consecrated until 19 September 1667. By 1735, the original church and sacristy had decayed badly. It was closed in 1754 by decree of the archbishop, so that a new church could be built in its place. Construction began the following year and the new church was consecrated in 1783.

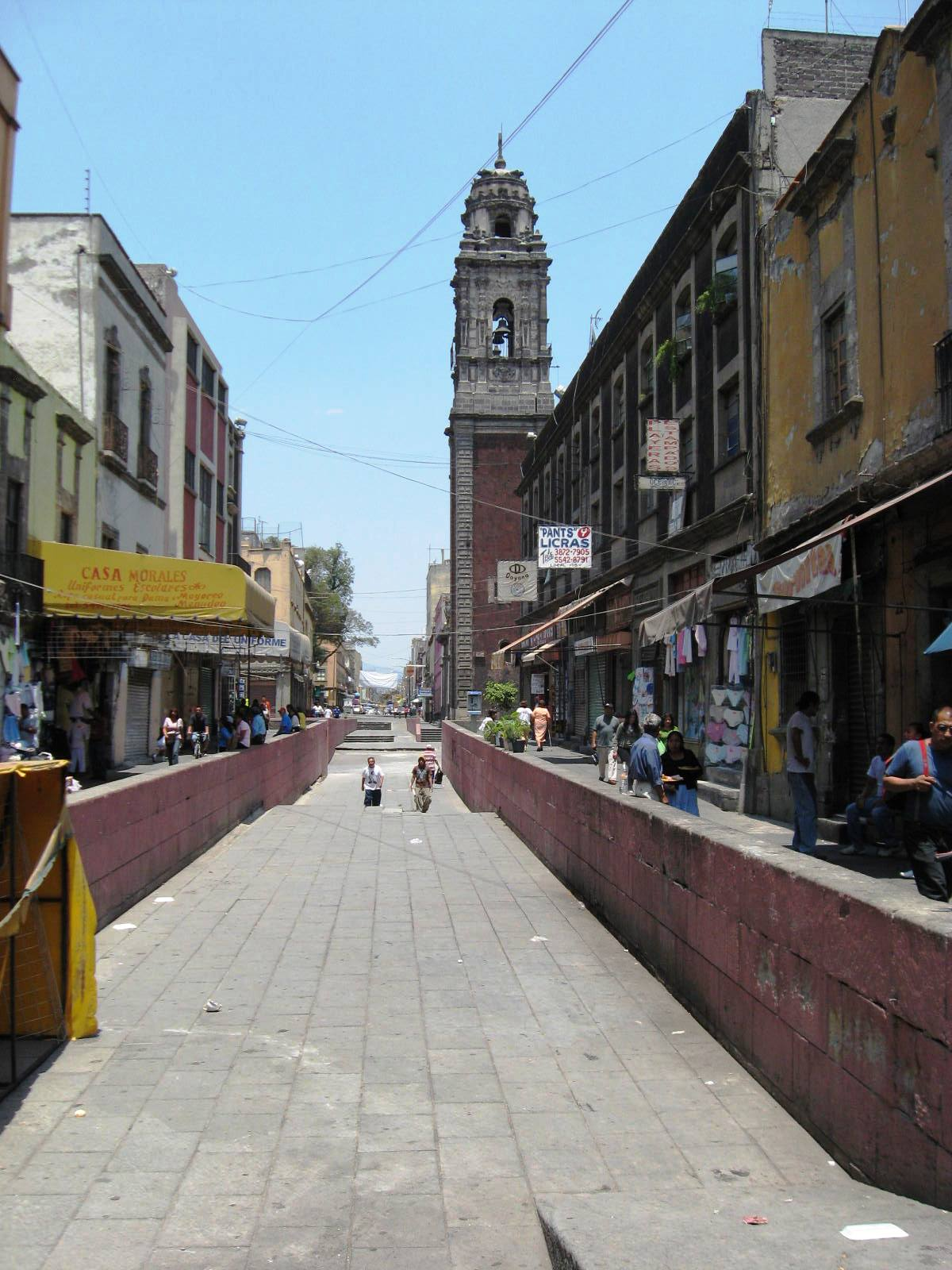
Looking north on Alhondiga Street towards the sinking church

The instability of the ground beneath Mexico City has caused serious problems for the church over time. In 1805–06, the floor of the church was raised to correct a flooding problem during the rainy season, but the problem returned and worsened until it forced the closing of the church for major repairs from 1855 to 1858. In the 1860s, the building began to tilt to the south, prompting the placement of a stone wedge to keep this problem from getting worse. In 1924, it was estimated that the current church building had sunk 2.85 meters since it was built. The sunken and hidden original foundations were excavated in 1980. A square was recently created here to help stop the subsidence of the church.

The temple and hospital were closed in between 1859 and 1861 due to the Reform Laws. In 1859, the offices were separated from the church and parts of it were sold to private hands. Part of the hospital was ceded to the Lancasteriana Schools, which were nationalized in 1890, so this part of the hospital became government offices. By 1936, these offices were sold into private hands. The church was declared a national monument in 1932 as well as parts of the remaining hospital building.

== See also ==
- List of colonial churches in Mexico City
- 18th-century Western domes
