= Palacio de la Autonomía =

Coordinates: 19°26′4.17″N 99°7′50.29″W

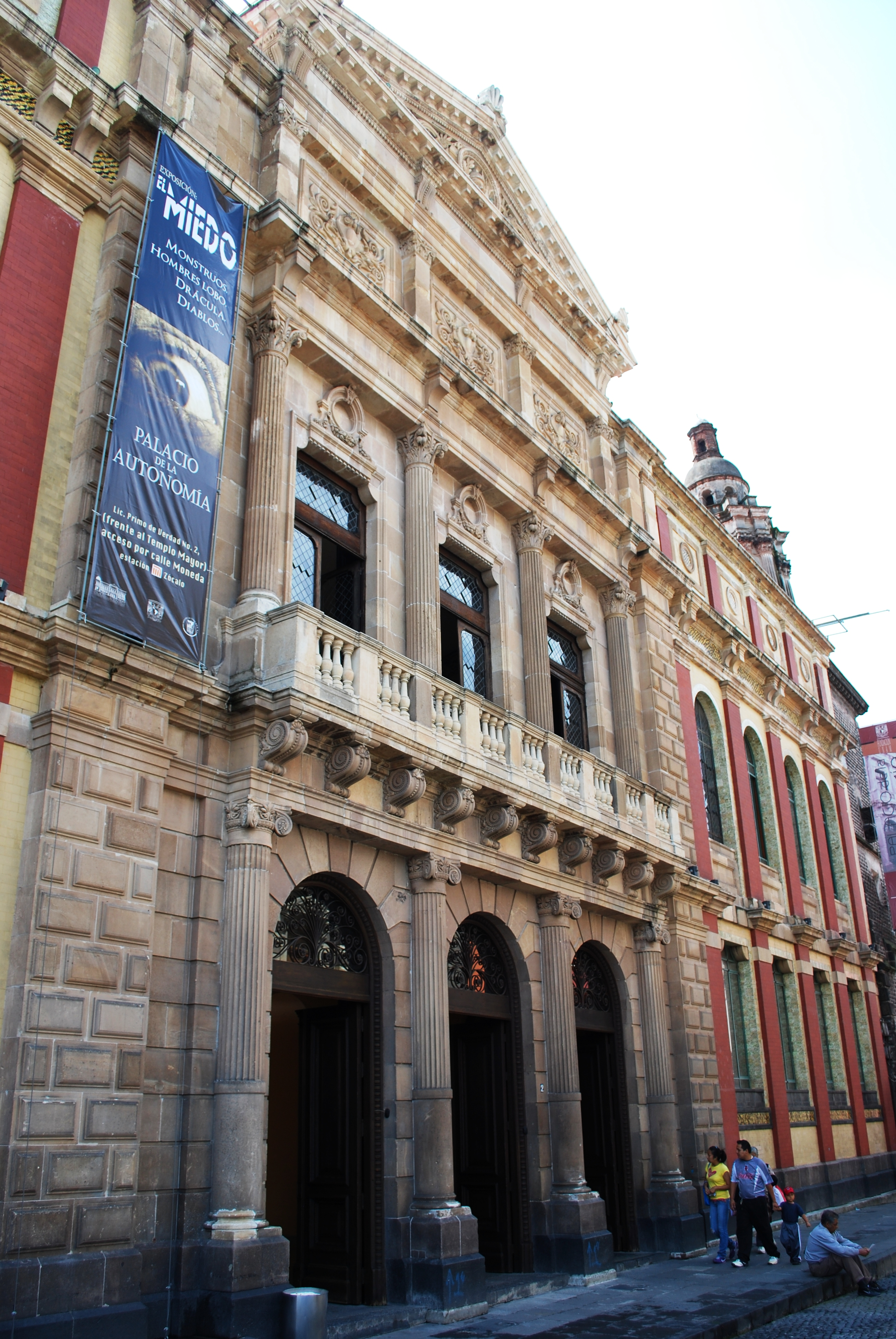
Part of the facade of the palace

The Palacio de la Autonomía (Autonomy Palace) is a museum and site where the Universidad Nacional Autónoma de México gained autonomy from direct government control in 1929. The building is from the late 19th century, and located on the corner of Licenciado de Verdad and Rep de Guatemala streets, north of Santa Teresa la Antigua and east of Templo Mayor. The site has a 500-year history, starting from part of lands granted by Hernán Cortés. The current building was constructed by the administration of President Porfirio Díaz, but it was ceded to the university in 1910. Since that time, the building has had a number of uses, including housing a dental school and a preparatory school. Today it houses the Museo de la Autonomía Universitaria (University Autonomy Museum).

== Description ==
This building was constructed during the Porfirio Díaz period and belongs to the Universidad Nacional Autónoma de México. The architecture of the building is considered to be eclectic, built of white stone brought from Pachuca, and a facade accentuated by a triangular pediment with a relief and foliage. Part of the building’s foundation lies on wall that surrounded the sacred plaza of the Templo Mayor.

== History ==
The site has a history of over 500 years. After the Conquest, Hernán Cortés distributed areas in the Aztec city of Tenochtitlan. This space was reserved for Luis de Rivera, the first representative of the Casa de Moneda (coin mint) in New Spain. Next, the area became part of the Santa Teresa la Antigua convent and after it was closed by the Reform Laws, the building here became housing. This property was then acquired by the government of Porfirio Díaz, which constructed the current building in the early 20th century. It was the site of the Escuela Normal de Maestros (Teachers’ College), then part of the Universidad Nacional de México, today Universidad Nacional Autónoma de México (UNAM) in 1910.

As part of UNAM, the building functioned as the dean’s offices. In 1929, documents were signed here which gave the university its autonomy from direct government control. After 1930, the building was the Escuela de Iniciación Universitaria (School of University Initiation) then the Escuela Nacional de Comerico y Administración (National School of Commerce and Administration). After much of the UNAM moved to the Ciudad Universitaria, it housed the Escuela National de Odontología, (National School do Dentistry). When this school moved in 1958, due to its growth, the building became the main campus of the Escuela de Enfermería y Obstetricia (School of Nursing and Obstetrics). Lastly, it became Plantel Número 2 “Doctor Erasmo Castellanos Quinto” of the Escuela Nacional Preparatoria (National Preparatory School), and functioned as such until 1978.

== Museo de la Autonomía Universitaria ==
A group of dentists organized a campaign to reconstruct the building in the early 2000s. Today, the building functions as a museum called the Museo de la Autonomía Universitaria (University Autonomy Museum) and is also commonly called the Palacio de la Autonomía (Autonomy Palace). The Universidad Nacional de México gained autonomy, free from direct government control of the curriculum, in 1929. This autonomy is considered to be extremely important to Mexican public universities. To celebrate the 75th anniversary of the event in 2004, the building was given its current name. The museum holds the Hall of Mexican Dentistry, a temporary exhibit hall, and archeological exhibit, and is the site of the university radio station UNAM-FM. It contains archives related to the major players in the university’s struggle to gain autonomy. There have been windows built into the foundation to allow visitors to see remnants of the old convent.
