= Estipite =

Type of architectural support

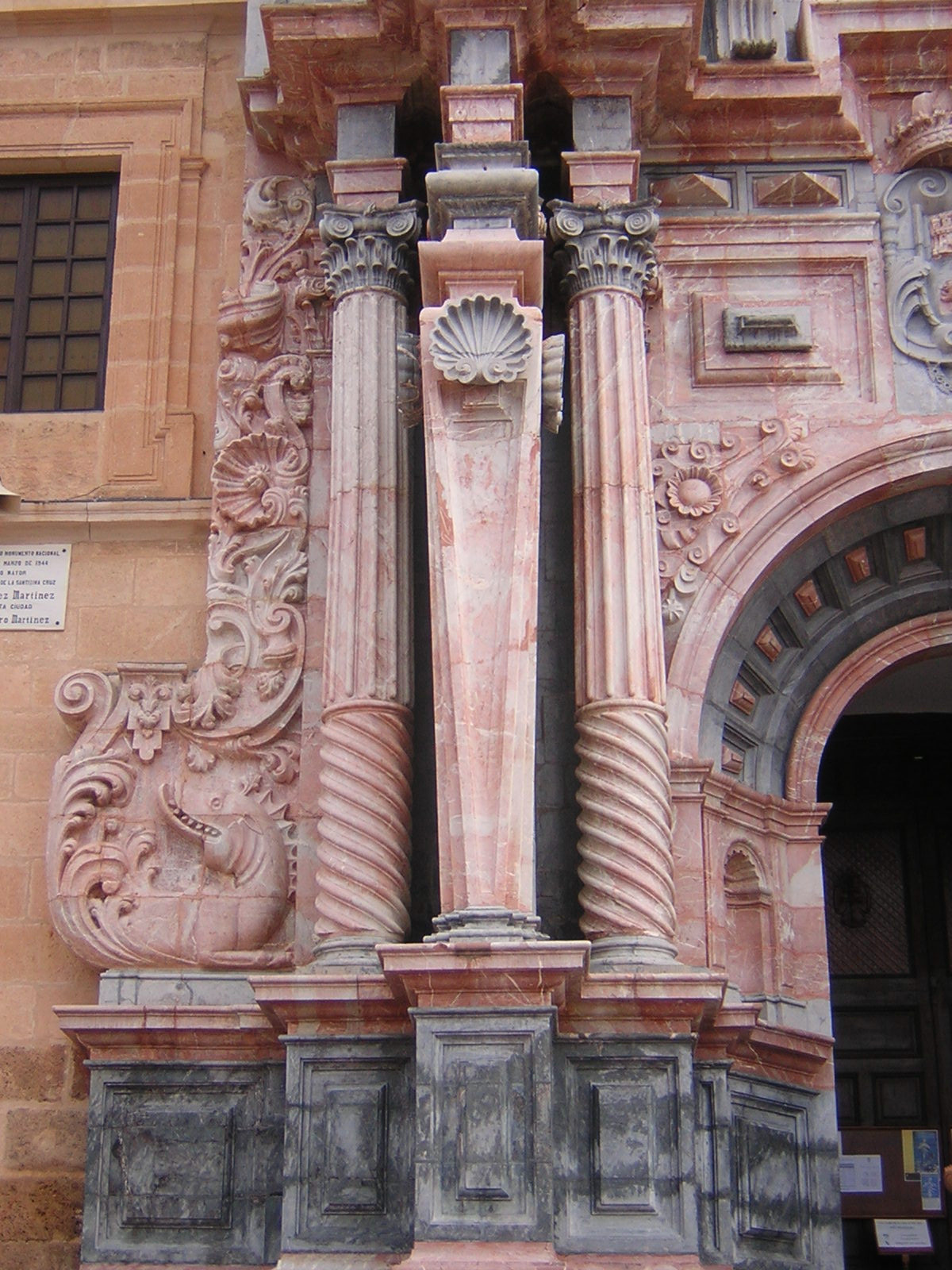
Estipite in the Basilica of la Vera Cruz in Caravaca de la Cruz, Region of Murcia, Spain.

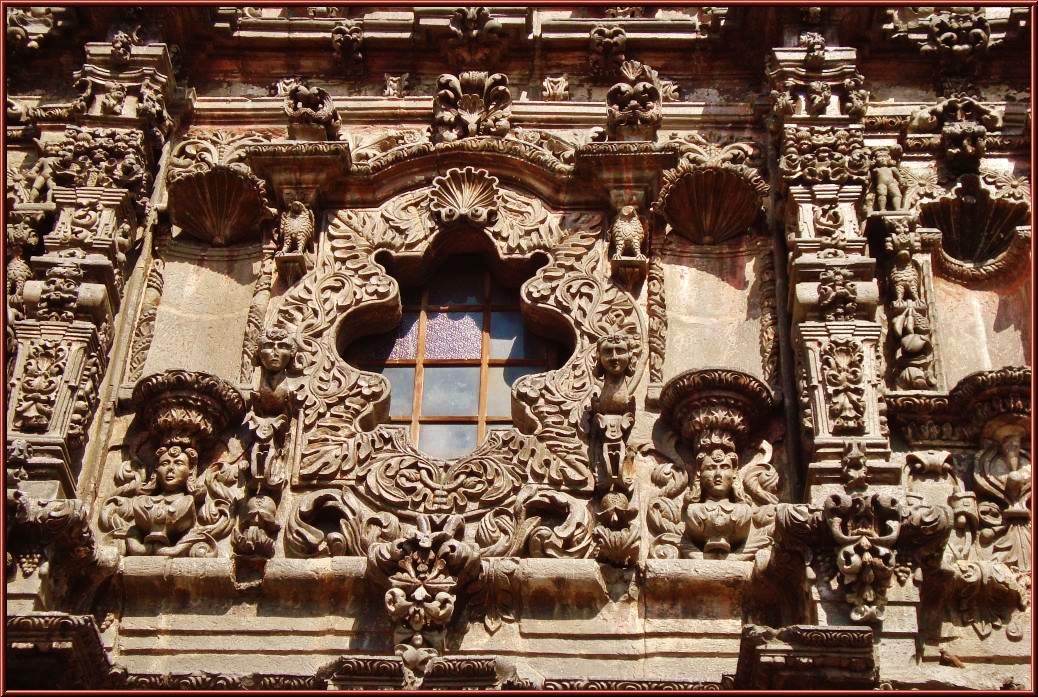
Estitipes on the facade of the Parroquia Antigua in Salamanca, State of Guanajuato, Mexico

The estipite column is a type of pilaster used in buildings in the Mannerist and Baroque styles, a moment when many classical architectural elements lost their simple shapes and became increasingly complex, offering a variety of forms and exuberant decoration. This sort of column has the shape of an inverted pyramid or obelisk. Sometimes the shaft is wider in its middle part than in the base or capital. Examples include Michelangelo’s Biblioteca Laurenziana (1523–1571). It became later a signature element of the Churrigueresque Baroque style of Spain and Spanish America in the 18th century.

== Characteristics ==
=== Form ===
The shape of the estipite has a narrow base and the shaft is in the shape of an inverted obelisk. This is a variation to previous uses of the pilaster which deviates from classical architecture with its form. In classical architecture, pilasters give the impression that they have a load bearing function. However, due to the obelisk shape of the estipite, this tradition is disrupted. The estipite is not supposed to look solid, instead be dynamic and create movement. Creating an apparent lightness to the structure.

Manuel Toussaint defines estipites as:

“A supporting member, square or rectangular in section, and formed of multiple elements: pyramids and truncated prisms, parallelepipeds, superimposed foliage, medallions, garlands, bouquets, festoons. The ornament is all vegetable, applied to geometric forms”.

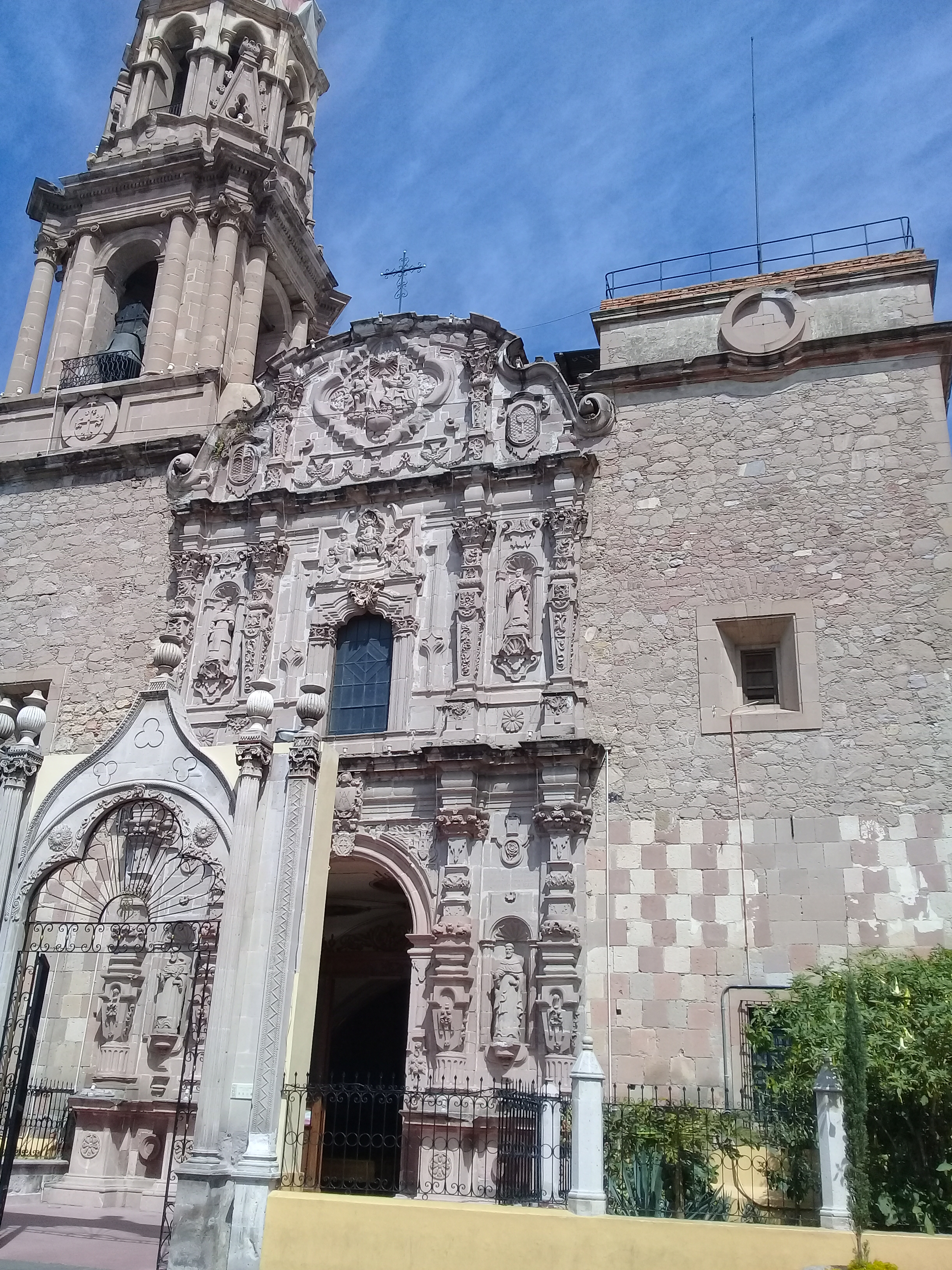
Estipite on main portal of Portada Templo de Nuestra Señora del Rosario

=== Capitals ===
The capitals usually highlight the line of a broken cornice and are unabridged. They may be connected to another estipite by a horizontal entablature. The capital for esiplite pilasters are typically Corinthian. There are deviations to this. For example, decorations of vegetation and cherub heads take the place of the Corinthian capital in Capilla del Sagrario for the Cathedral of Segovia by Jeronimo de Balbas.

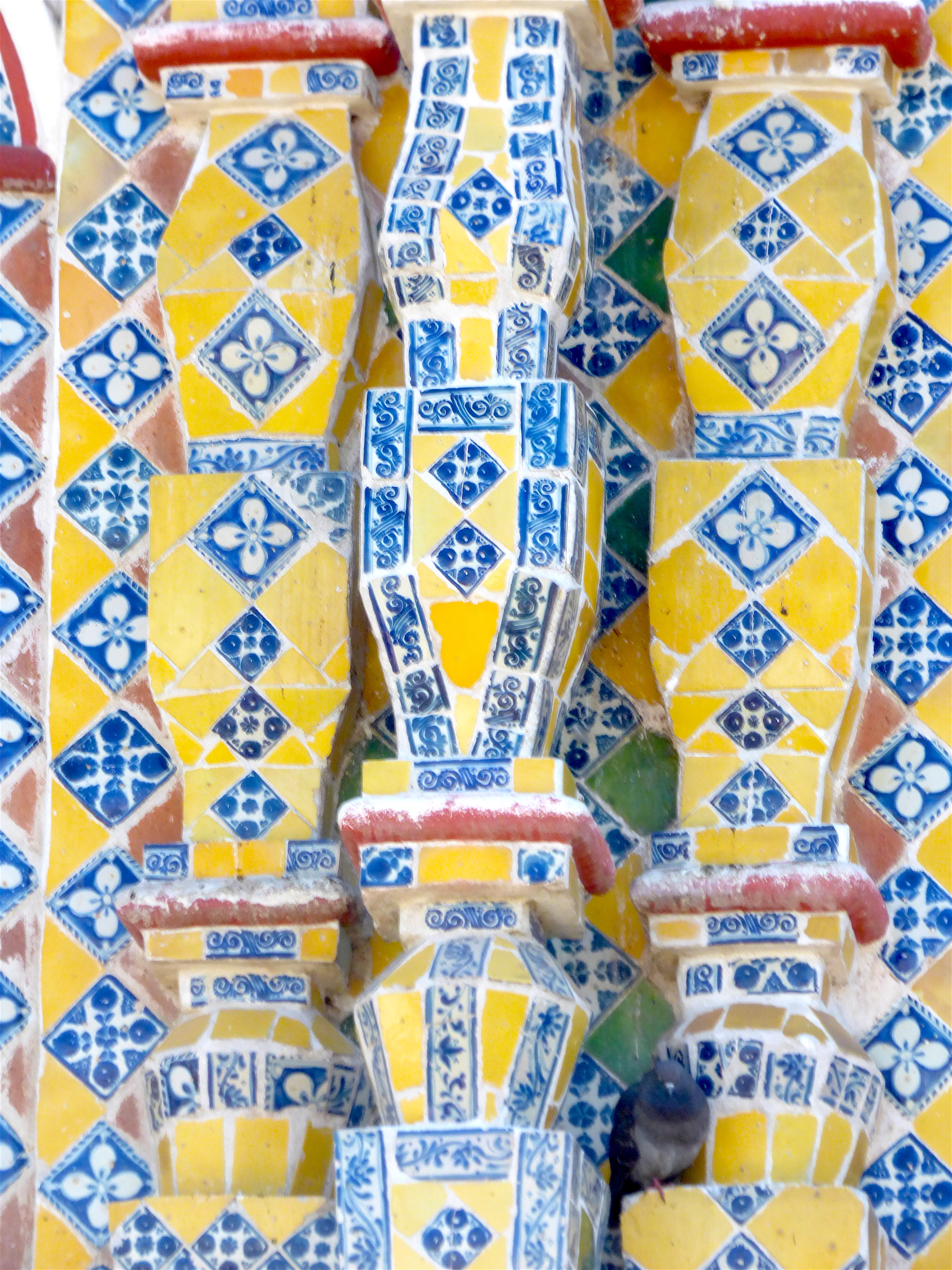
Estípites from Templo de San Francisco Acatepec

=== Double Columns ===
Similar to Baroque styling with the use of double columns, the double estipites is a feature in some Churrigueresque buildings.

=== Alongside other styles ===
Estipies were utilized between Ultra-Baroque and the rise of Neo-Classical styles. Therefore, even though estipites are distinct in style, they are sometimes used alongside Solomonic and classical columns. A good example of this is San Francisco Acatepec in Puebla.

== History ==
=== Origin ===
In Richard W. Amero's thesis, The California Building: A Case Of The Misunderstood Baroque, he claims that Michelangelo is the first one to use an estipite pilaster in the Laurentian Library (1526). Meanwhile, John F Moffitt states in his thesis El Sagrario Metropolitano, Wendel Dietterlin, and The Estipite that Juan de Arfe y Villafane could have been the first known person to mention the estipite. This is seen in Arfe's, Description de la traza de la custodia de la Iglesia de Sevilla (1587). Therefore, the origins of the estipite are debated among scholars.

=== Spain and New Spain ===
The architect known for making estipites popular is Jose Benito de Churriguera, who has the Churrigueresque style named after him. His first works with estipites were Capilla del Sagrario for the Segovia Cathedral (1690) and Convento de San Esteban, Salamanca (1693). Jeronimo de Balbas was a Spanish architect who moved to Mexico (New Spain) in 1717, and introduced the new world to estipites. His work Retablo de los Reyes in the Mexico City Metropolitan Cathedral (1718–37) was the first building to showcase estipites in the New World. The era of estipites only lasted till 1783 with the establishment of Academia de San Carlos, an architecture school in New Spain. However, in this short period of time 1736, the completion of Retablo de los Reyes, till 1783, many buildings in New Spain (Mexico) had facades or alters with estipites. Due to the decline in popularity for the estipite pilasters, Solomonic and Classical columns were revived throughout Spain and New Spain. This led to many estipite-style monuments to be destroyed or replaced with classical columns in the last decades of the 1800s.

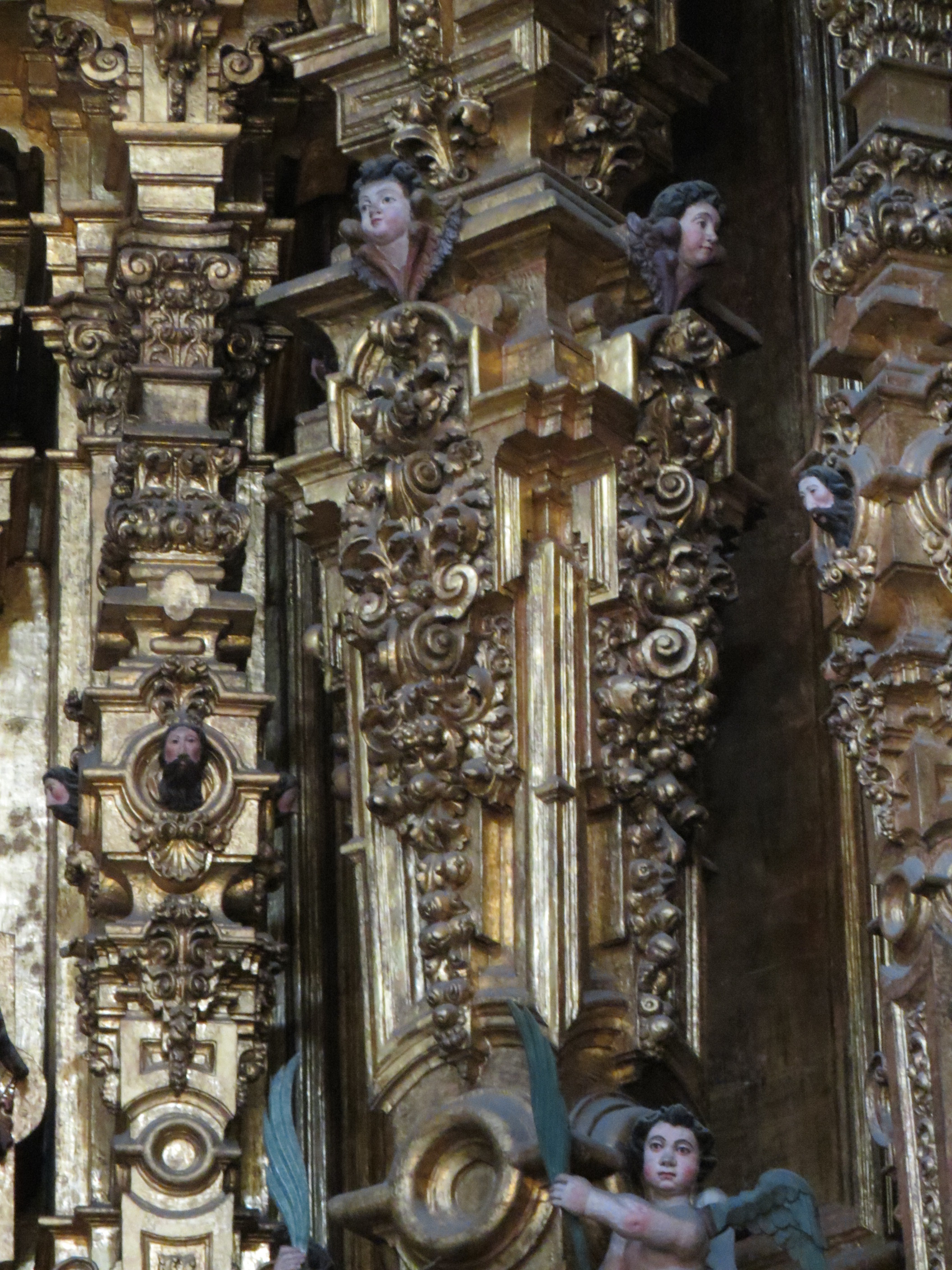
Estipites from Retablo de los Reyes in Mexico City Metropolitan Cathedral in México

== Buildings ==
Small list of buildings that estipites are a design feature for.

Name	Architect	Location	Date of Feature	Feature
Mission San Xavier del Bac	Ignacio Gaona	Tucson, Arizona	1783-97	Retable
Segovia Cathedral	José Benito de Churriguera	Segovia, Spain	1690	Capilla del sagrario
Convento de San Esteban, Salamanca	José Benito de Churriguera	Salamanca, Spain	1693	Reredos
Serville Sagrario()	Jeronimo de Balbas ()	Seville, Spain	1712	High Altar
Iglesia de San Juan ()	Jeronimo de Balbas ()	Marchena, Spain	1714	choir stalls
Mexico City Metropolitan Cathedral	Jeronimo de Balbas ()	Mexico City, Mexico	1718-37	Retablo de los Reyes () Altar of Forgiveness
La Santísima Church	Lorenzo Rodriguez	Mexico City, Mexico	1755-83	Main Portal (architecture)
California Building (California Quadrangle)		San Diego, California		
Temple of San Francisco Javier()	Ildefonso de Iniesta Bejarano and Duran()	Tepotzotlán, Mexico		Main Portal (architecture)
church of la Cata		Guanajuato, Mexico		Main Portal (architecture)
la castrense (The Chapel of Our Lady of Light)		Santa Fe, New Mexico	1761	Reredos of Our Lady of Light
Church of Santa Prisca de Taxco		Taxco, Mexico	1751-58	Main Portal (architecture)
Church of San Francisco Acatepec		San Francisco Acatepec, Mexico		Main Portal (architecture)
Royal Collegiate Church of Saint Hippolytus		Córdoba, Spain	1736	Main Portal (architecture)
Sagrario of the Cathedral of Granada	Francisco Hurtado Izquierdo	Granada, Spain	designed in 1707	Retablo de Santiago()
Laurentian Library ?	Michelangelo	Florence, Italy	Designed in 1526	Walls of vestibule
