= José María Vaca de Guzmán =

- Born: 5 April 1744
- Died: c. 1816
- Known for: first laureate poet for the Royal Spanish Academy

José María Vaca de Guzmán-Manrique Herdocia Guzmán-Paredes y Pisón (5 April 1744 - c. 1816) was a Spanish statesman, poet and literary critic of the Neoclassic period. He was the brother of the lawyer and writer Gutierre Joaquín Vaca de Guzmán, who wrote the satire of the Viajes de Enrique Wanton.

== Biography ==
Las naves de Cortés destruidas (1778).

He was born in Marchena, but studied first in Seville, then obtained a doctorate in law at the University of Alcalá. he would become rector of the Minor College of Santiago. He became mayor of the chancellery of Granada and Minister of Crime in the Audiencia of Cataluña. In 1789, he was named to the king's council.

He was the first laureate poet for the Royal Spanish Academy as a prize for his epic poem in octaves: Las naves de Cortés destruidas (The ships of Cortez destroyed, 1778). His competitor for the award was Nicolás Fernández de Moratín (1737-1780). In 1779, the academy also gave him an award for his epic Granada rendida (Surrender of Granada, 1779), in which his competitor was the son of Nicolas Fernandez, Leandro Fernández de Moratín (1760-1828).

== See also ==
- Royal Spanish Academy
