= Church of San Francisco Acatepec =

Roman Catholic church in Cholula, Puebla, Mexico

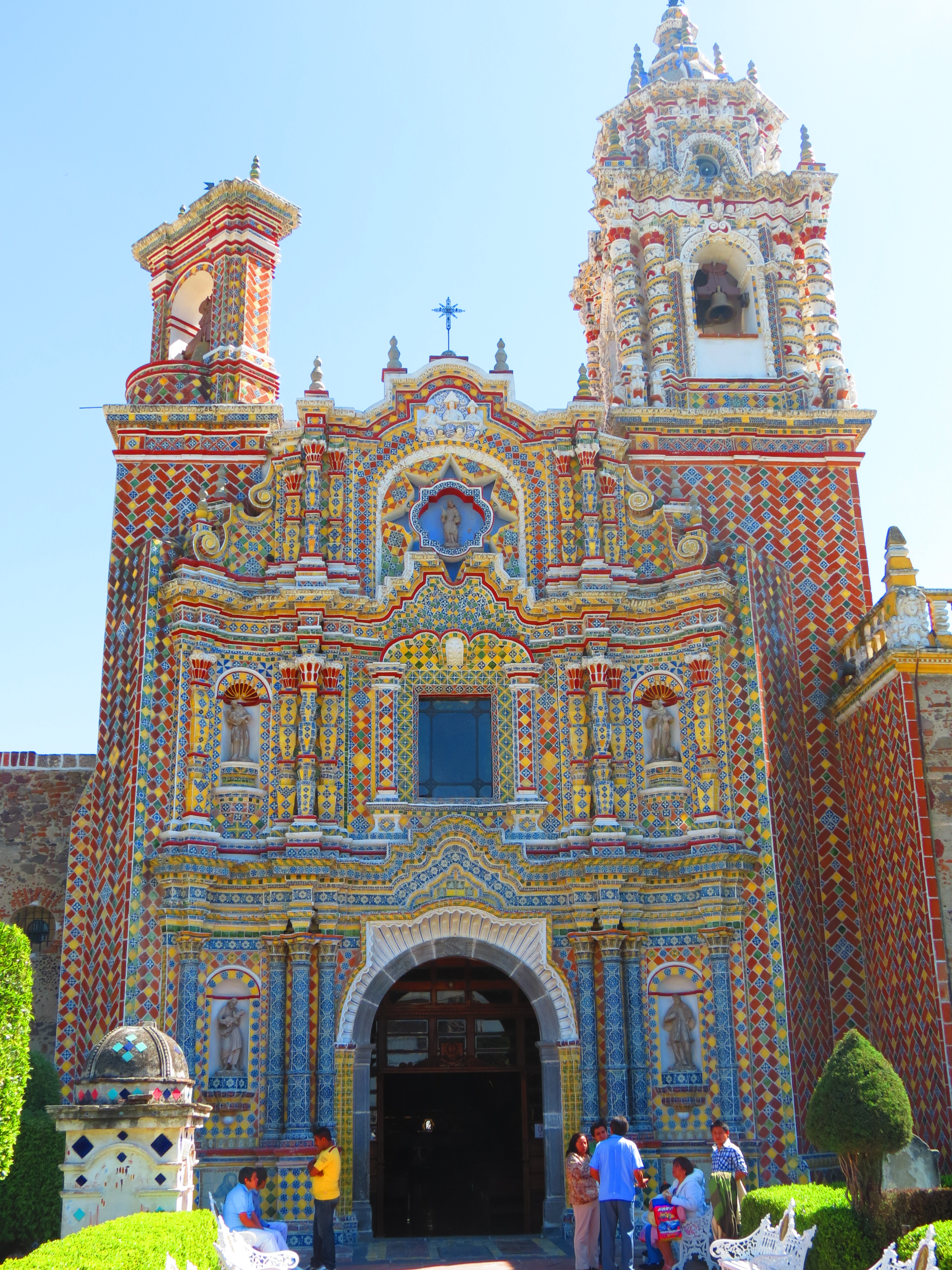
- The church's exterior in 2013

- Location within Mexico

Location
- Interactive map of Church of San Francisco Acatepec
- Coordinates: 19°1′20″N 98°18′31″W

Church of San Francisco Acatepec is a colonial religious building, characteristic of the Mexican Baroque architecture, especially recognized for its facade of Talavera mosaics combined with red brick. It is located in the town of San Francisco Acatepec in San Andrés Cholula, Metropolitan area of Puebla, in the state of Puebla, Mexico, and it was one of the first churches founded in the region.

The church started to build in mid-16th century and was completed in 1760. The azulejos of the facade were made between 1650 and 1750 made with Talavera pottery.

== History ==
The plans for its construction date back to the 16th century, when the Franciscans established itself on the site to found a small convent. In 1560, the Franciscans initiated a church on the same site, although the building of the present church began up to the second half of the 17th century and the 18th century.

The church, along with others that are located in Puebla and were built between the 17th and 18th centuries are characterized by the Talaveran polychromed facades and red brick. The ceramic of the church was handmade between the years 1650 and 1750, in the time when the Pueblan Talavera became part of the main decoration of the Baroque buildings of the region.

In 1946, director Emilio Fernández chose the Church of San Francisco Acatepec as one of the locations for the film Enamorada, starring María Félix and Pedro Armendáriz.

== Description ==
=== Atrium ===
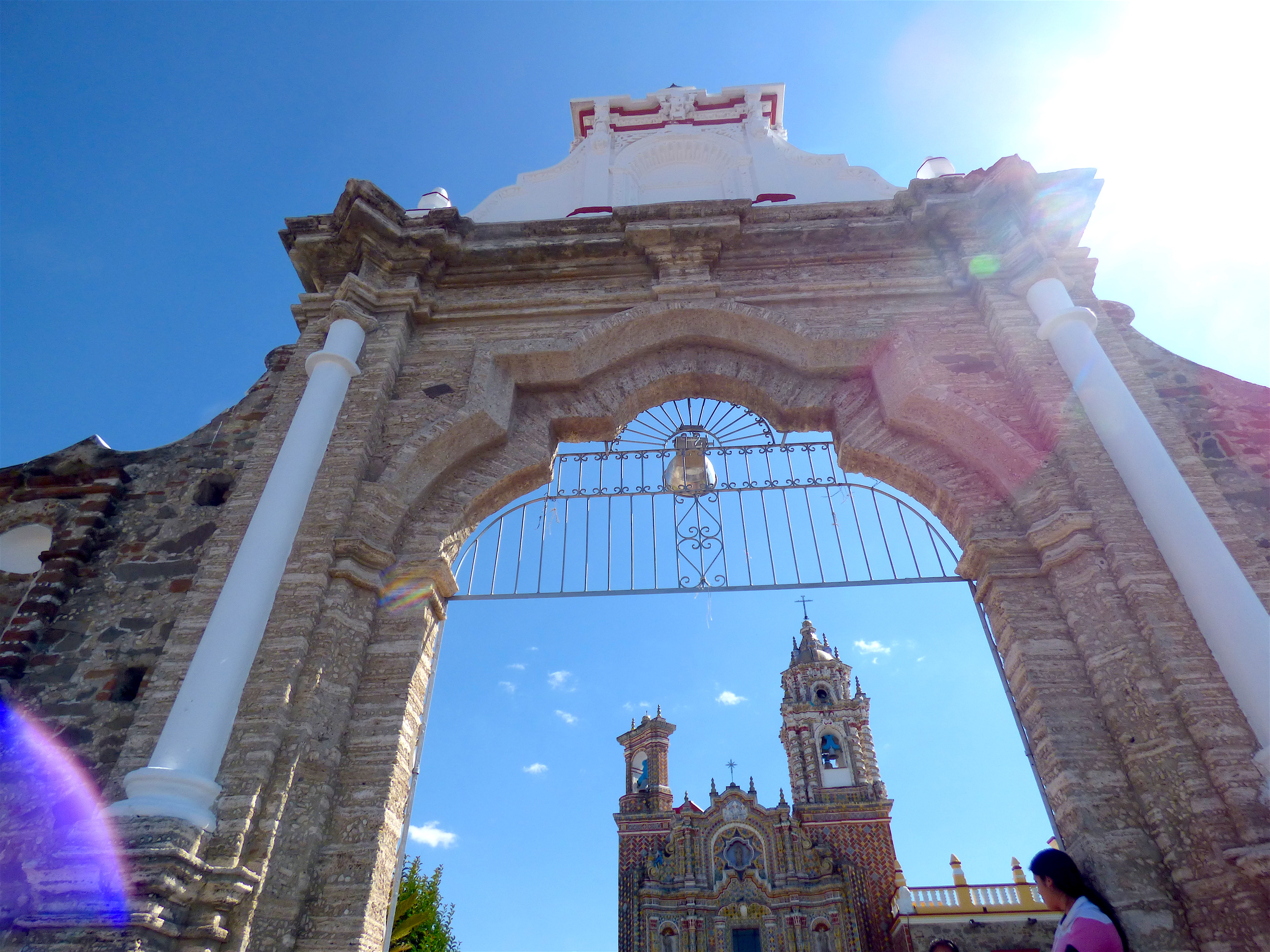
Portico of the church to enter the atrium

The atrium is wide, similar to other Franciscan atriums, but smaller in size. It has an octagonal shape and has three accesses. The main entrance has a mixtilinear arch, whose construction dates back to the 17th century.

The atrium, whose construction predated the present church, not only had an ornamental function, but also served as an capilla abierta and as a sacred cemetery for the population. During the 17th and 18th centuries there were burials, and even currently you can see some of the tombs, of which the oldest dates back to 1887.

=== Plan ===
It has a Latin cross plan with seven bodies; in the first are the choir and the sotocoro (the area below the loft); in the sixth the transept and in the seventh the chancel. The sacristy is on the south side of the transept, which is rectangular in size and consists of two bodies. The vault of the church is a barrel vault with lunettes; the dome is semicircular with octagonal drum. Toussaint said that the plant and the elevation of the facade are of "Borromininesque origin".

=== Facade ===
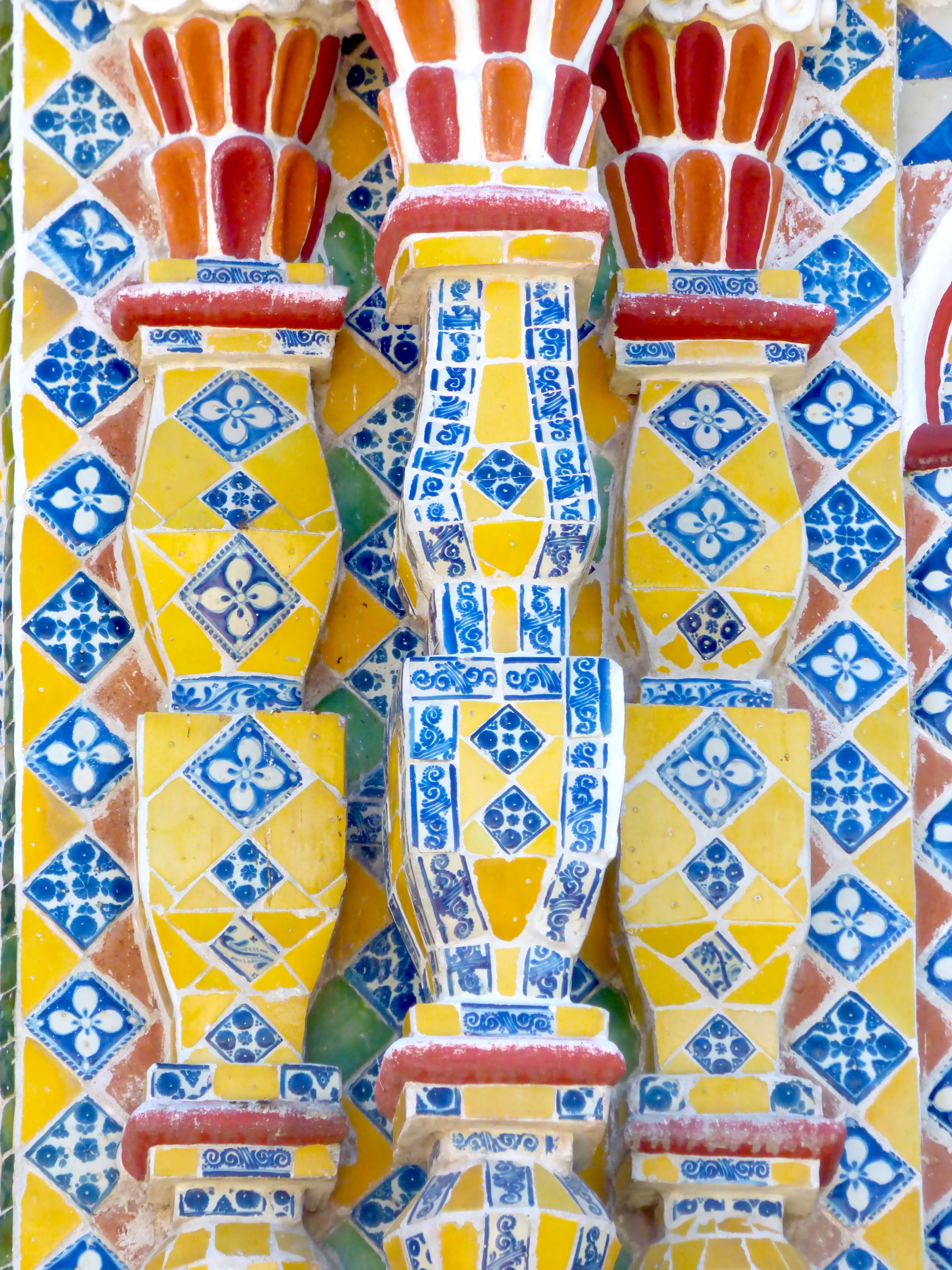
Estipites of the facade of the Church of San Francisco Actepec

The facade dates from the late 18th century, as have estipite columns. It highlights its polychromed Baroque decoration coated with ceramics with Talavera azulejos made specifically for this church. The color of the pottery refers to the Virgin Mary, by the white and the blue, and to Saint Joseph by the green and yellow. It has two bodies and a finish with volutes, torch-shaped pinnacles found both in the bell-gable and in the tower, which resemble elements of fine pastry. According to Manuel Toussaint, it looks like a "porcelain church". It has small stylistic estipite pilasters attached to the facade completely covered with azulejos, as well as the salomonic columns found in the only tower of the church. In this regard, Moreno Villa cites:

In this case, the azulejery reaches delirium. And admiration for astonishment. The work is a great ceramic toy raised on earth. In front of it, one no longer thinks about whether it is a church or whether it obeys a Borrominian pattern. We are truly within the world of whimsical, of dreaming. Everything in it is color and brightness.

— José Moreno Villa

Vargas Lugo said that the facade does not follow traditional forms, because in addition to the estipite pilasters, it has a star-shaped oculus and moulded cornices in the style of the last 18th century Baroque.

=== Tower ===
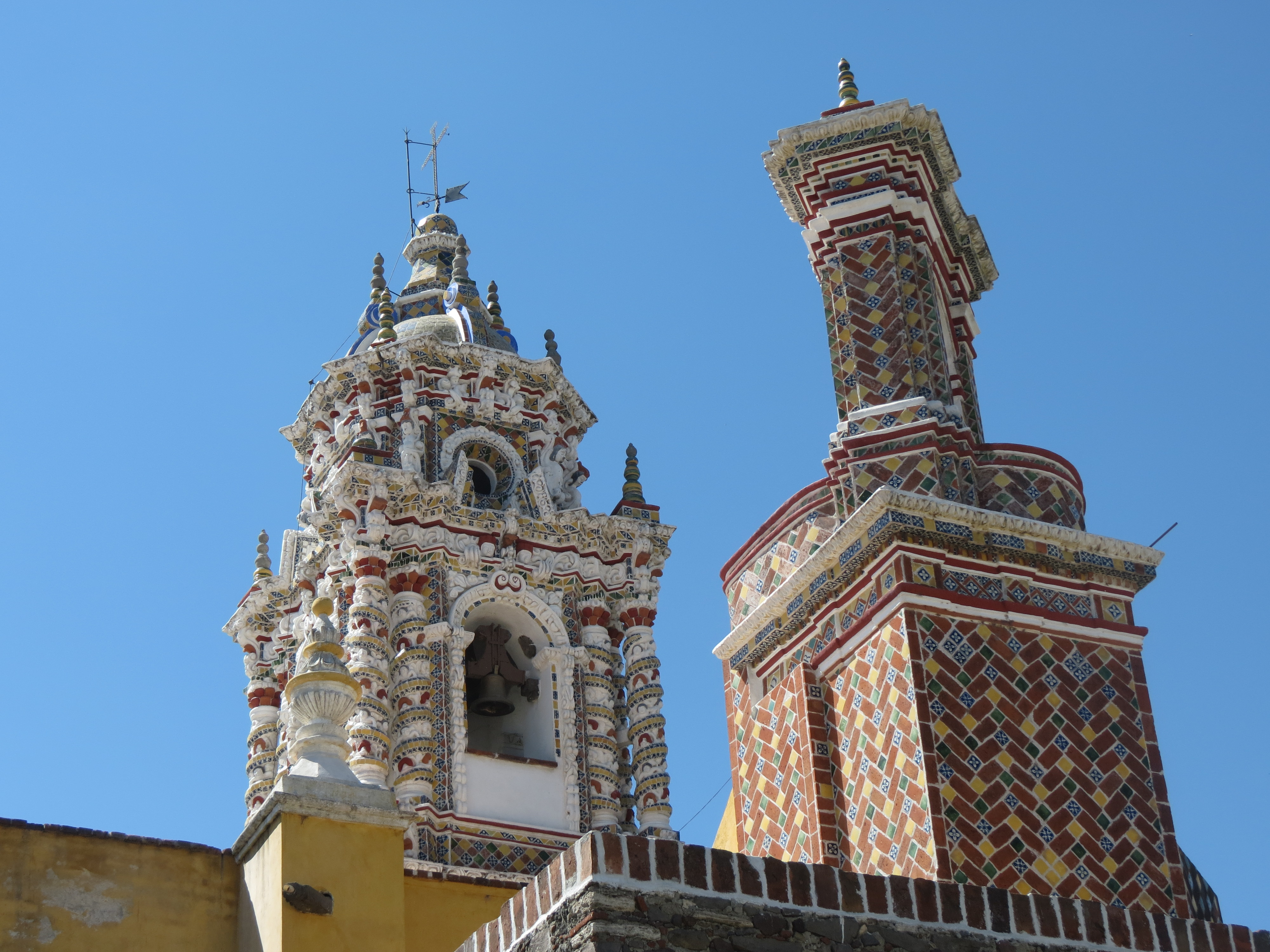
Bell tower of the church.

Manuel Toussaint said that the tower is covered with a maiolica that, like the facade, has Baroque guidelines, and that it has very outstanding decorative elements inside the church. The church also has an extra bell tower on the right decorated with red bricks and azulejos of different colors.

=== Interior ===
The church has an interior with a decoration rich in golden mouldings and figures made with polychromy. The keystones to the arches and the corbels that interrupt the cornices are of particular interest, according to Toussaint.

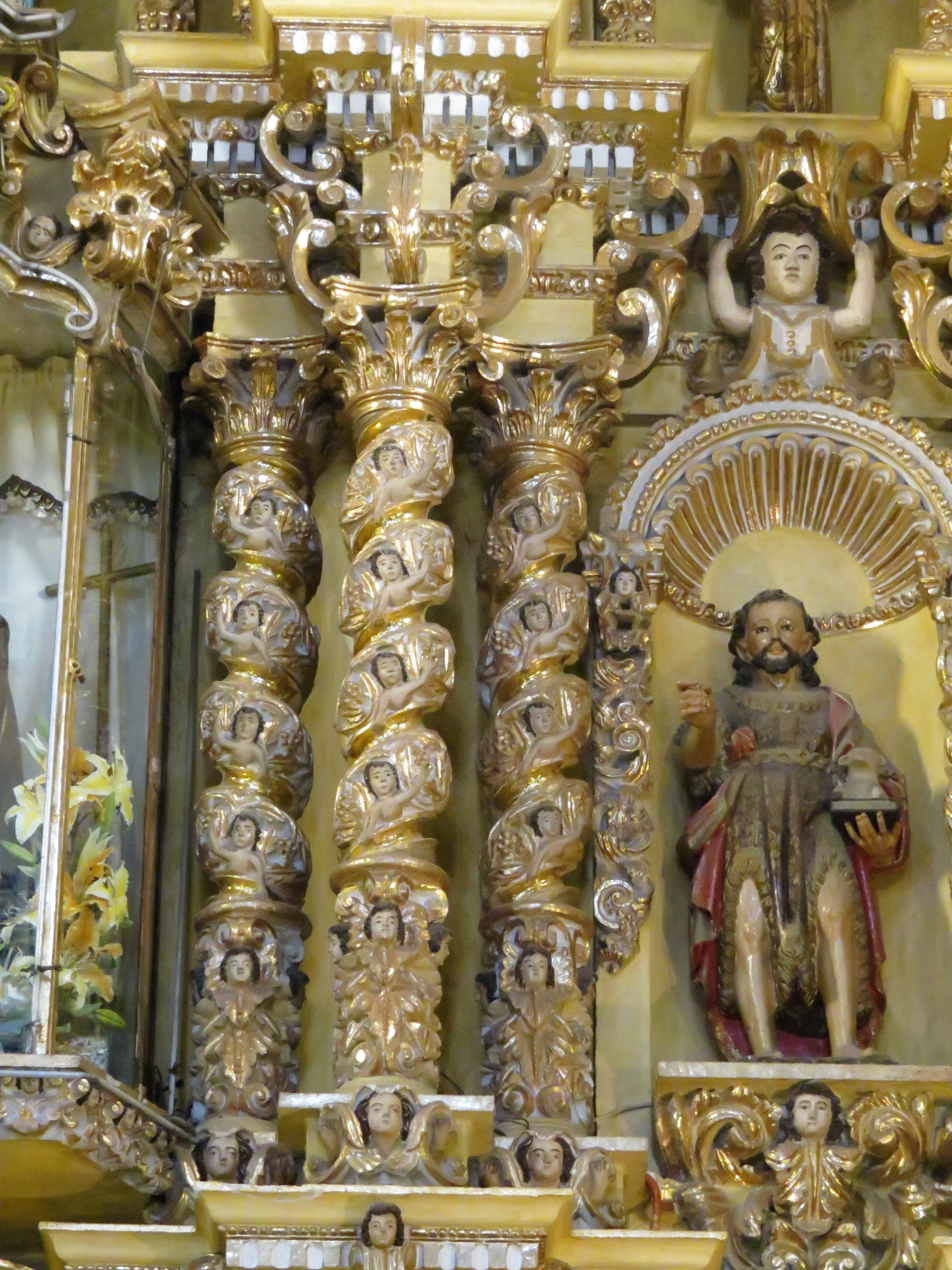
Interior of the Church of San Francisco Acatepec

Like the portal, the interior has Baroque elements with a golden altarpiece on the altar. It has elements reminiscent of the Chapel del Rosario, also in Puebla, but interpreted in a popular way. Unlike the Church of Santa María Tonantzintla, its interior does not reflect the indigenous iconography so profusely.

The golden reliefs of the interior are the characteristic of the interior; in the part of the choir stands out the abundance of polychromy. Ciancas said that ”the naïve and popular note given by countless defuras of little angels that populate the salomonic columns of the altars appears", which were renewed after a fire in the interior.

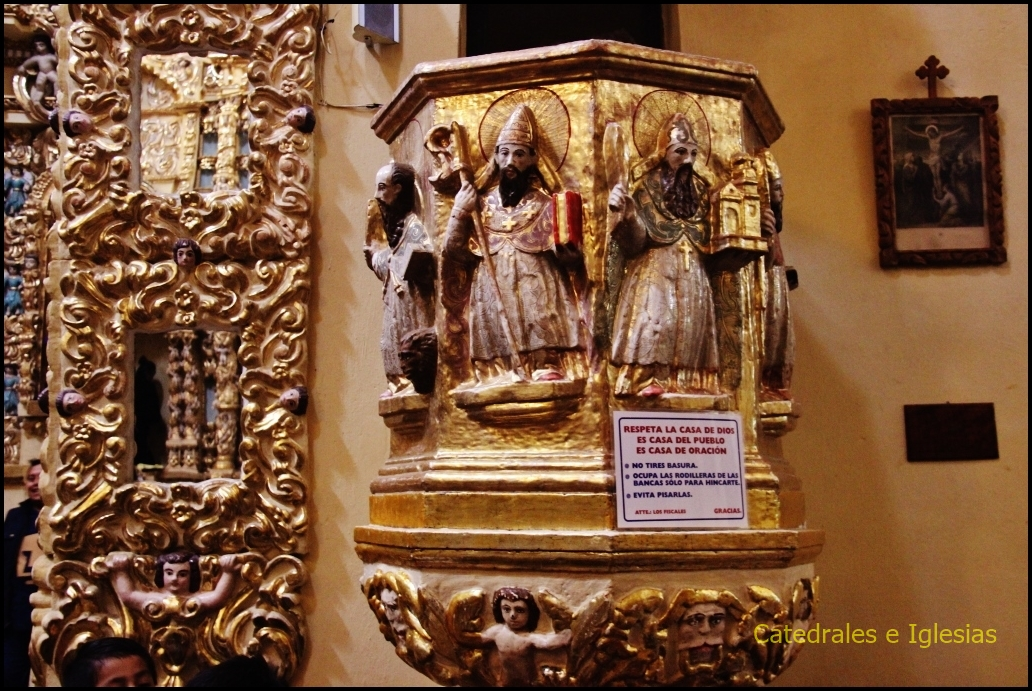
Pulpit inside the church

Highlights the work with plaster with the Image of the Incarnation and the Birth of the Son of God, with elements of the Holy Trinity and a radiant sun. In the vault of the guide base lies the Holy Family. Other plaster images of the interior represent angels, cherubs, sexless children, as well as three golden reredos on the three walls, including the altar.

The saints of the altarpiece are carved in wood and polychromed with the technique of the estofado. The pulpit also stands out for its shape, which also has a polychromed decoration.

On the side arches we can see passages from the Gospels characterizing the attributes of the tetramorphs: Saint Matthew with an angel, Saint Mark with a lion, Saint Luke with a bull and Saint John with an eagle. The stained glass of the church is represented by the image of Saint Francis Of Assisi, the main advocation of the church.

== Gallery ==
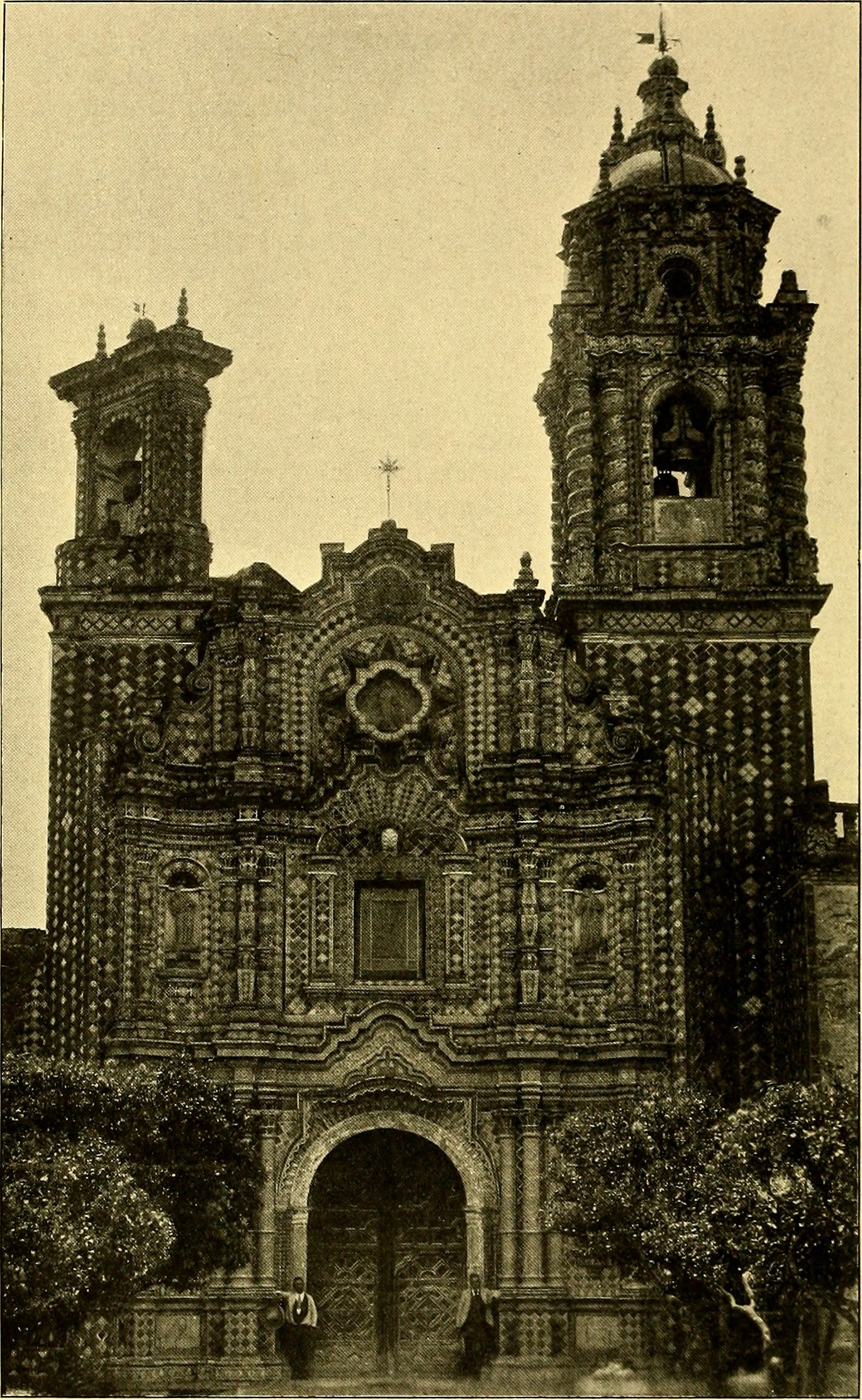
The church in 1908. Pennsylvania Museum Bulletin

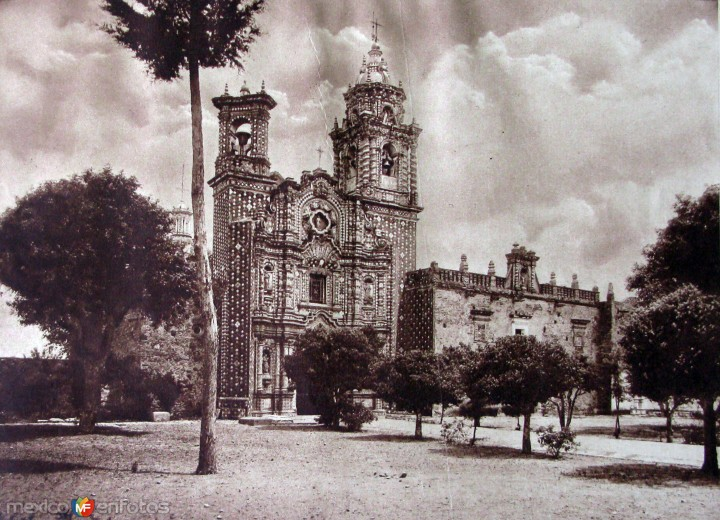
Facade. Photo of 1924 by Manuel Toissant

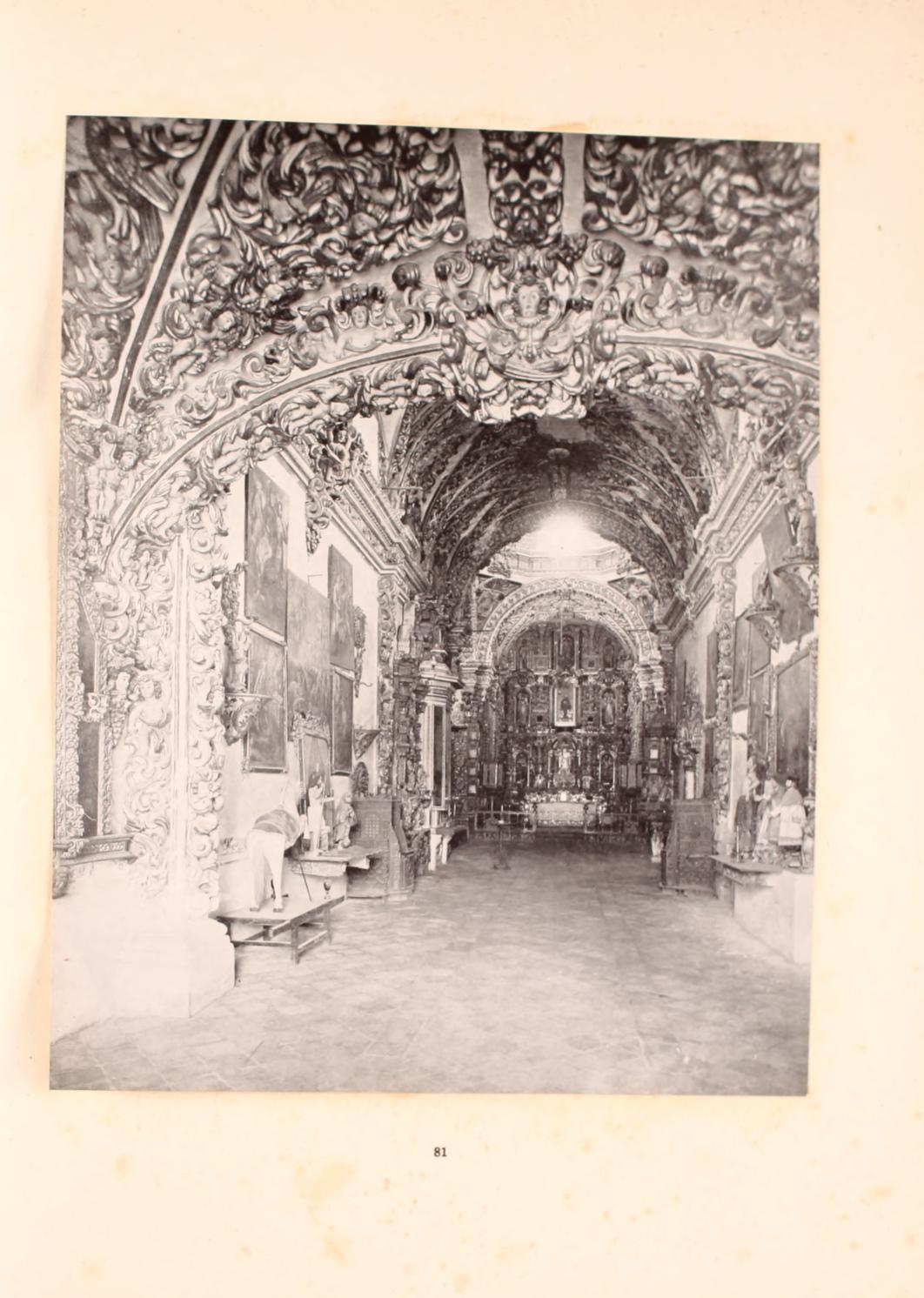
Interior. Photo of 1924 by Manuel Toissant

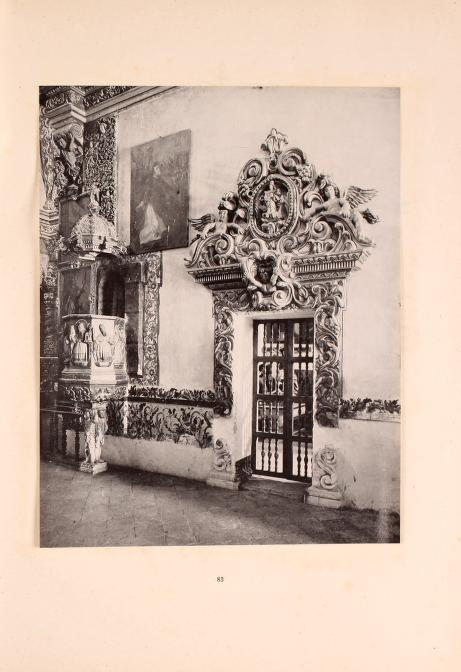
Pulpit and door. Photo of 1924 by Manuel Toissant

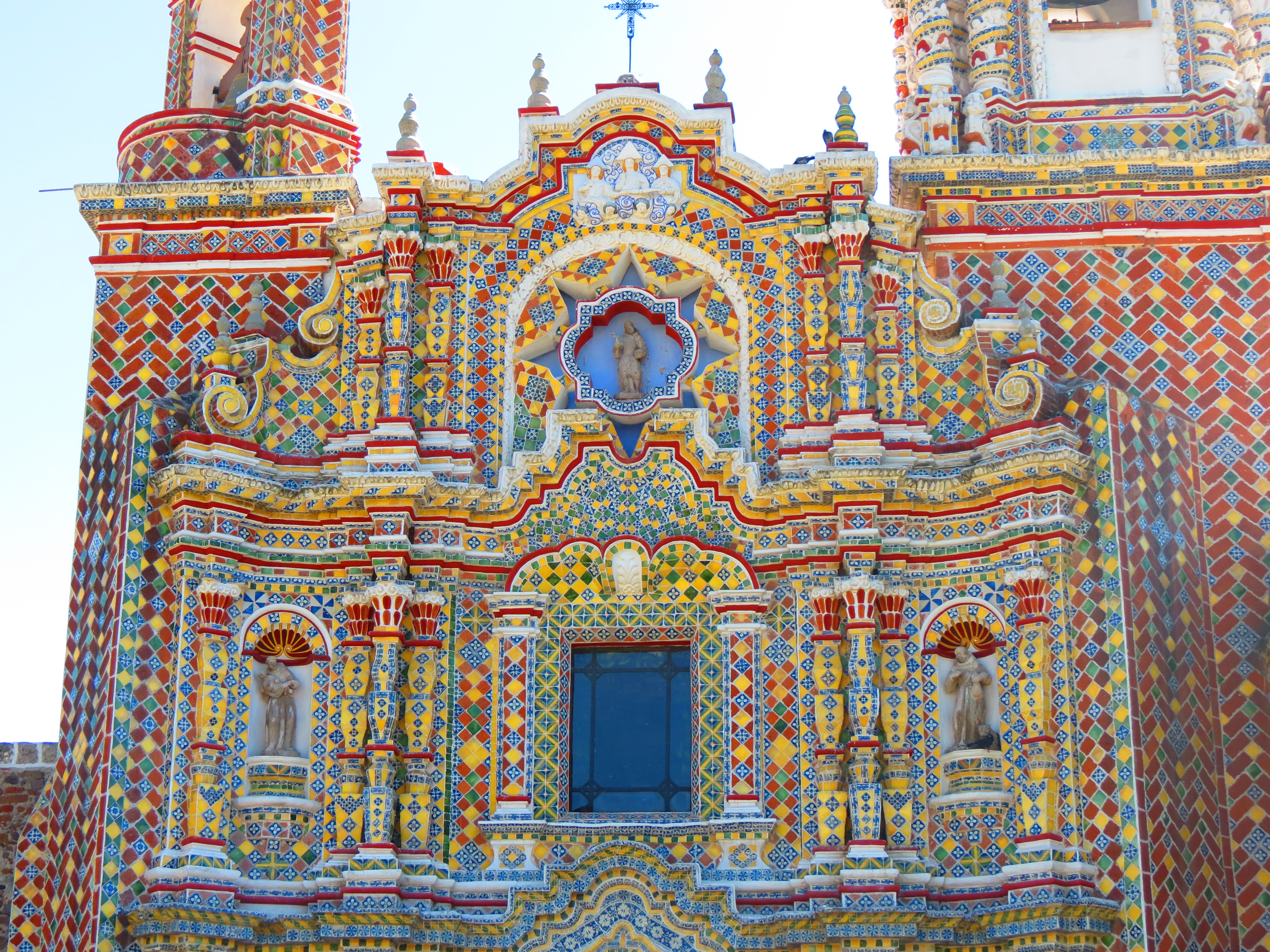

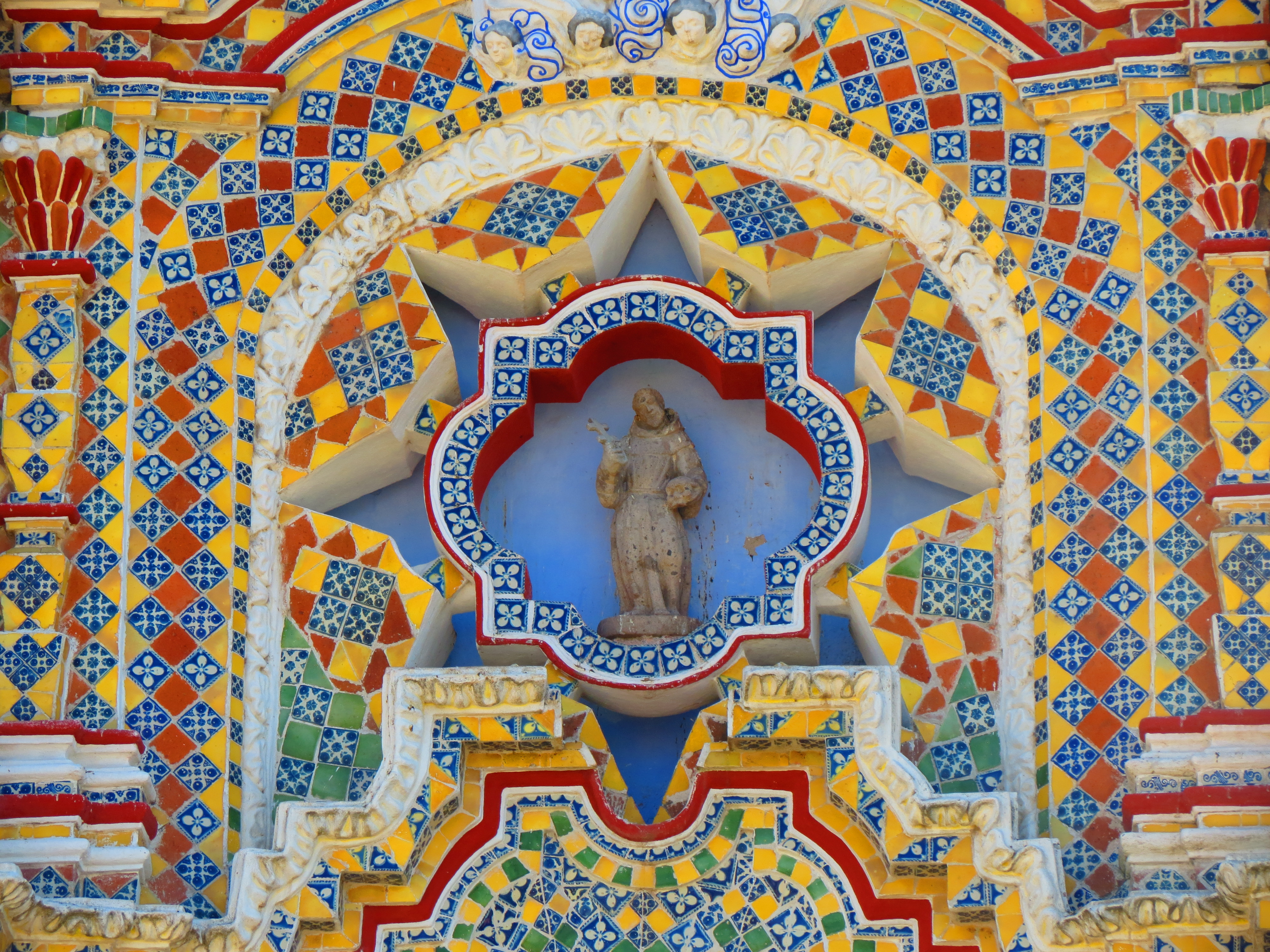

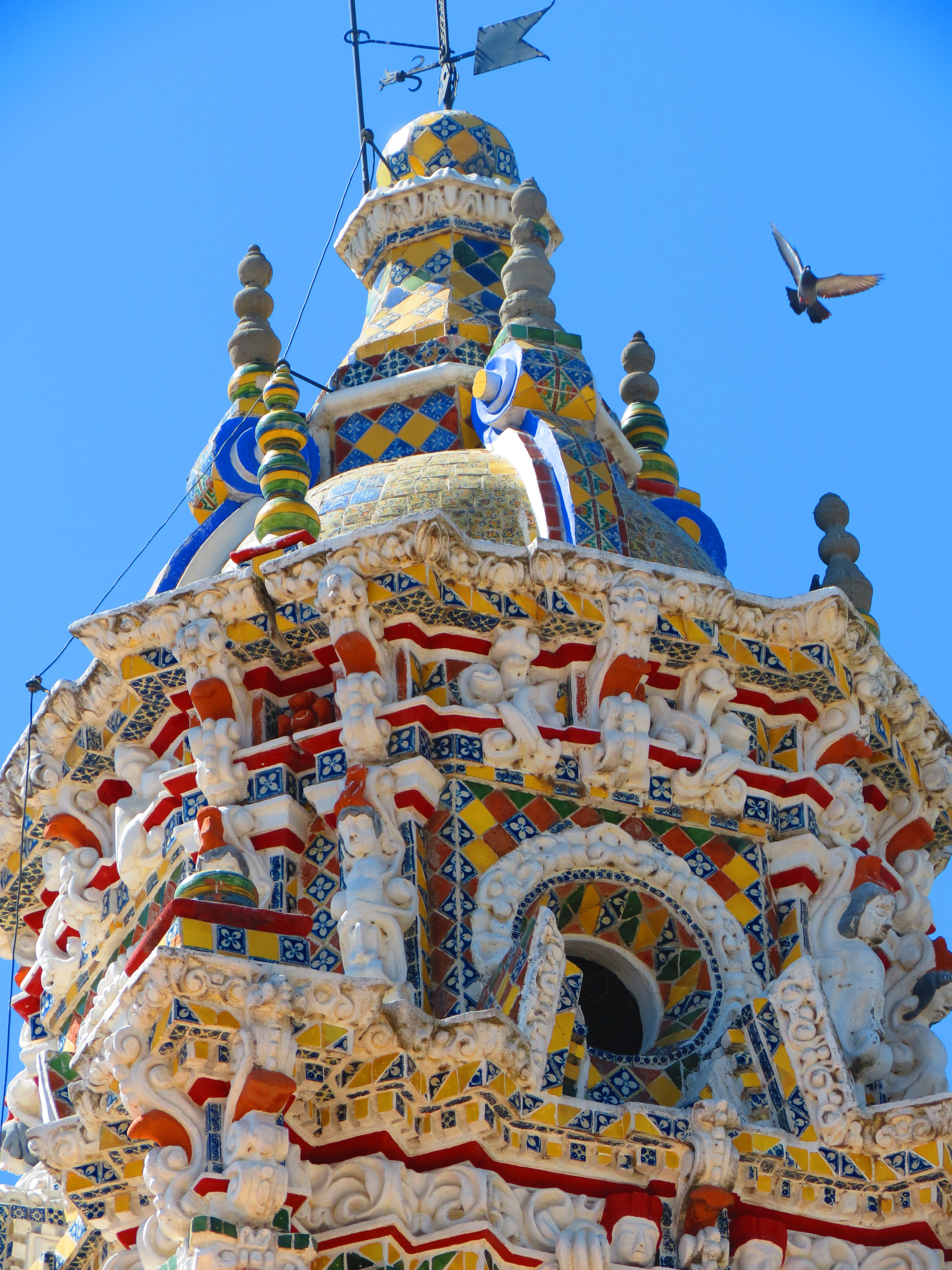

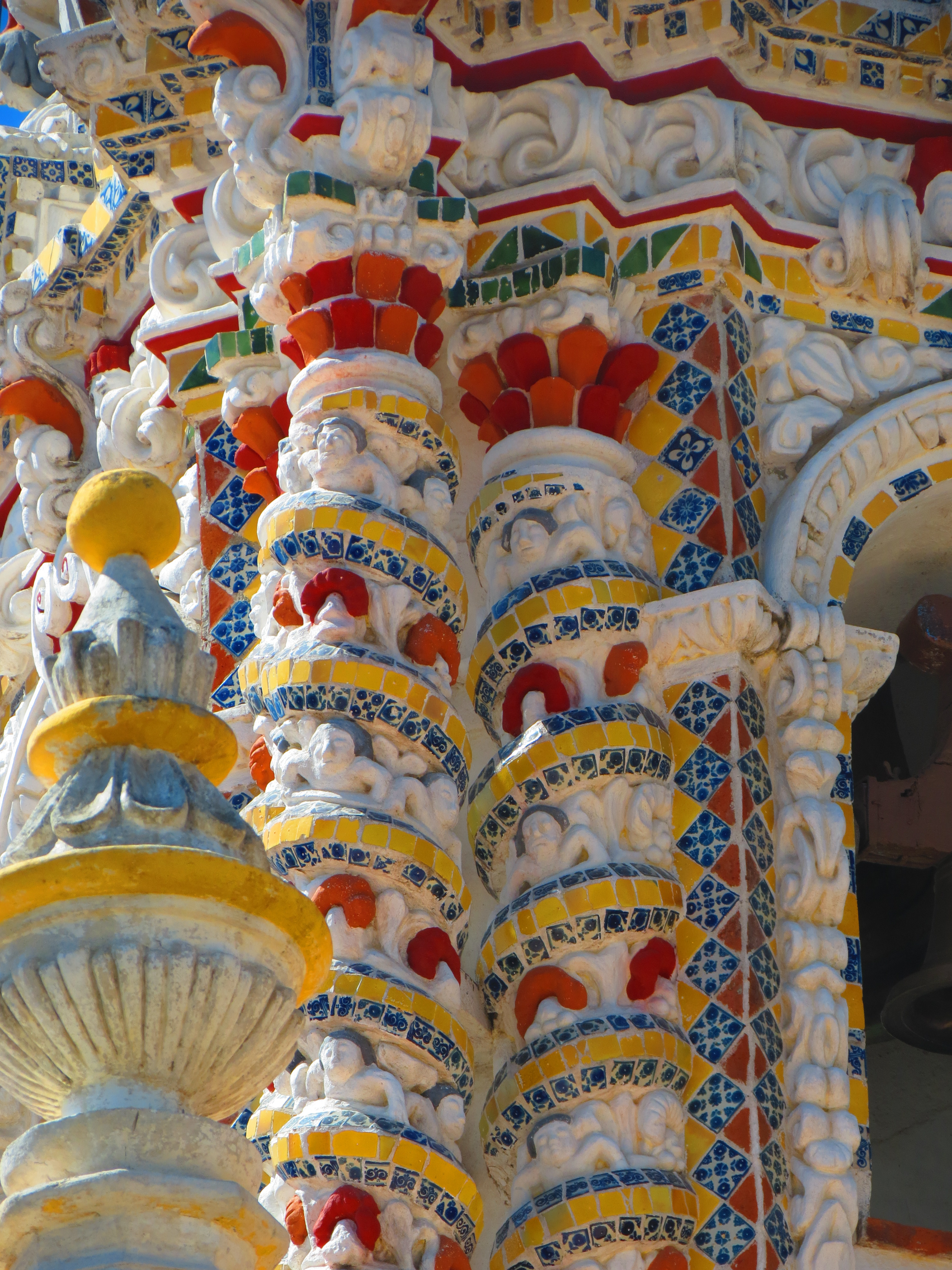

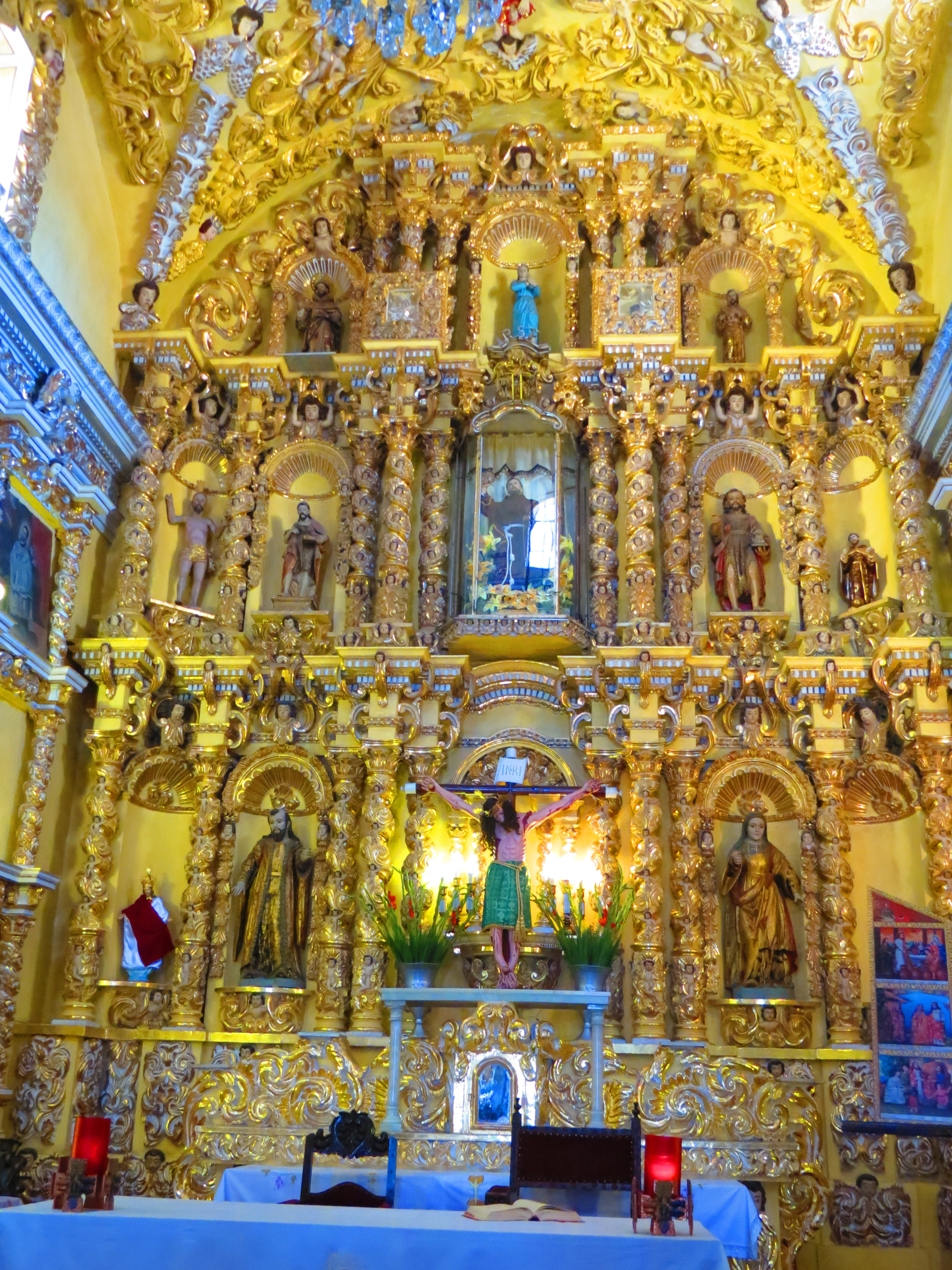

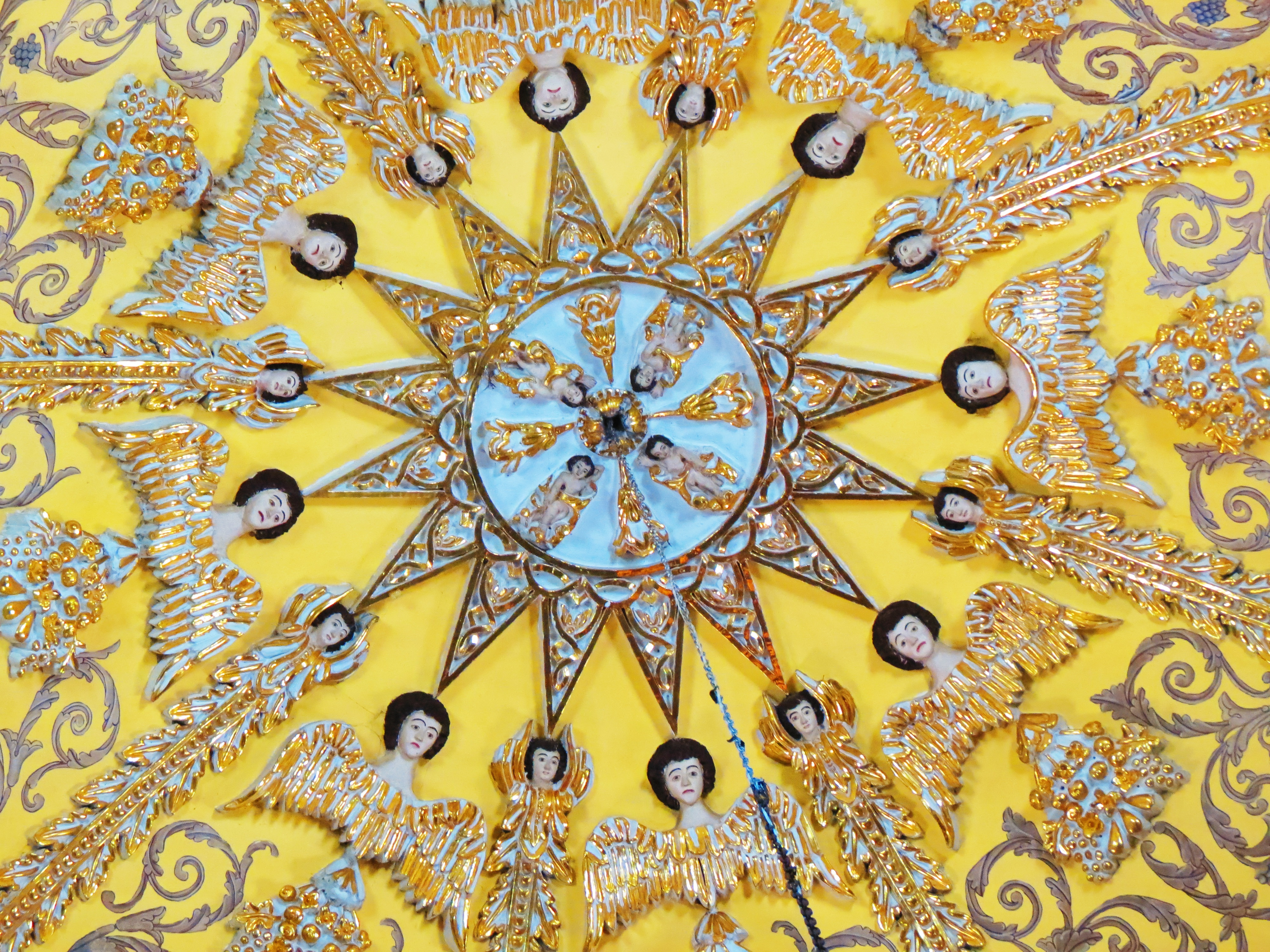

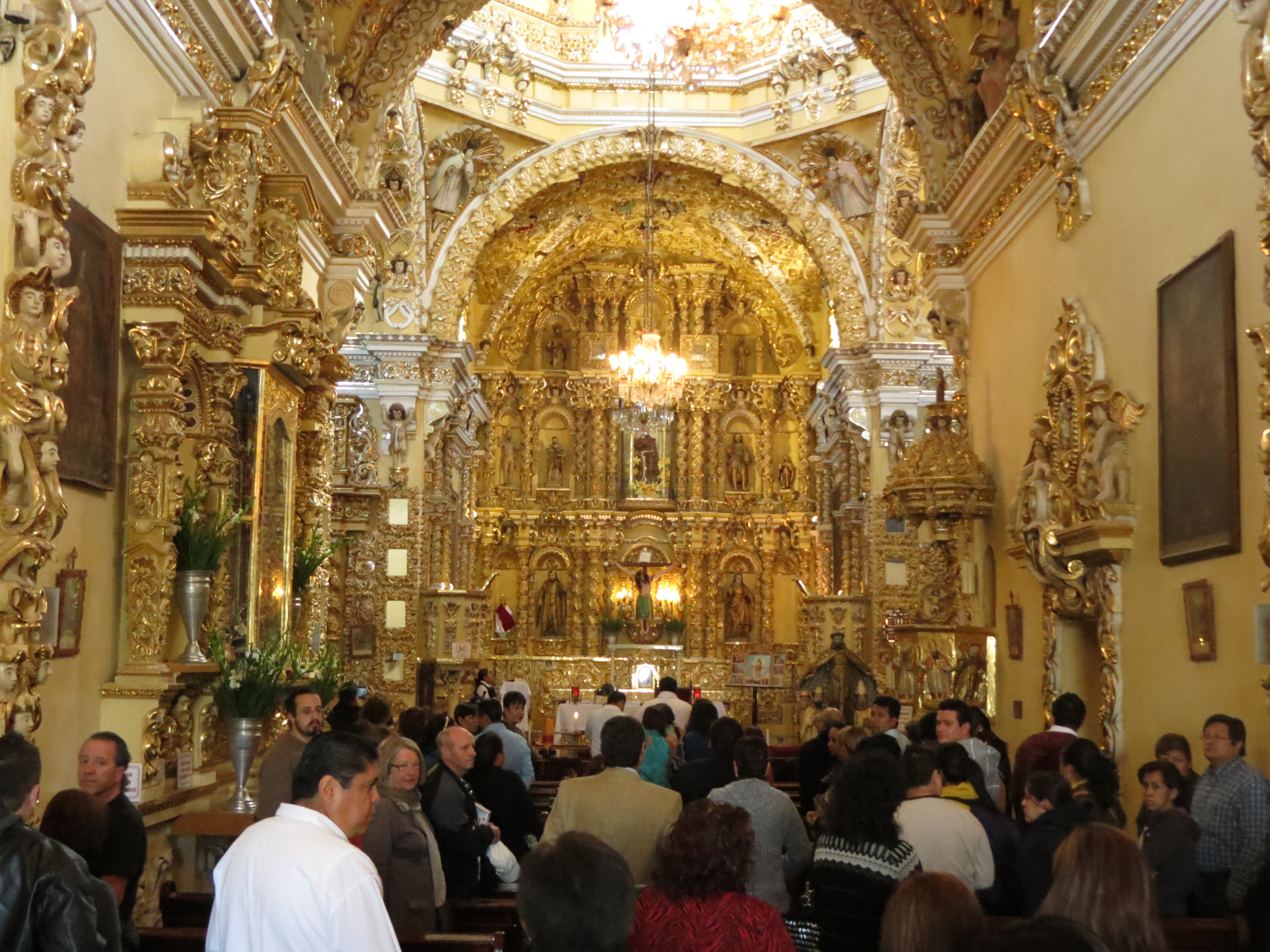

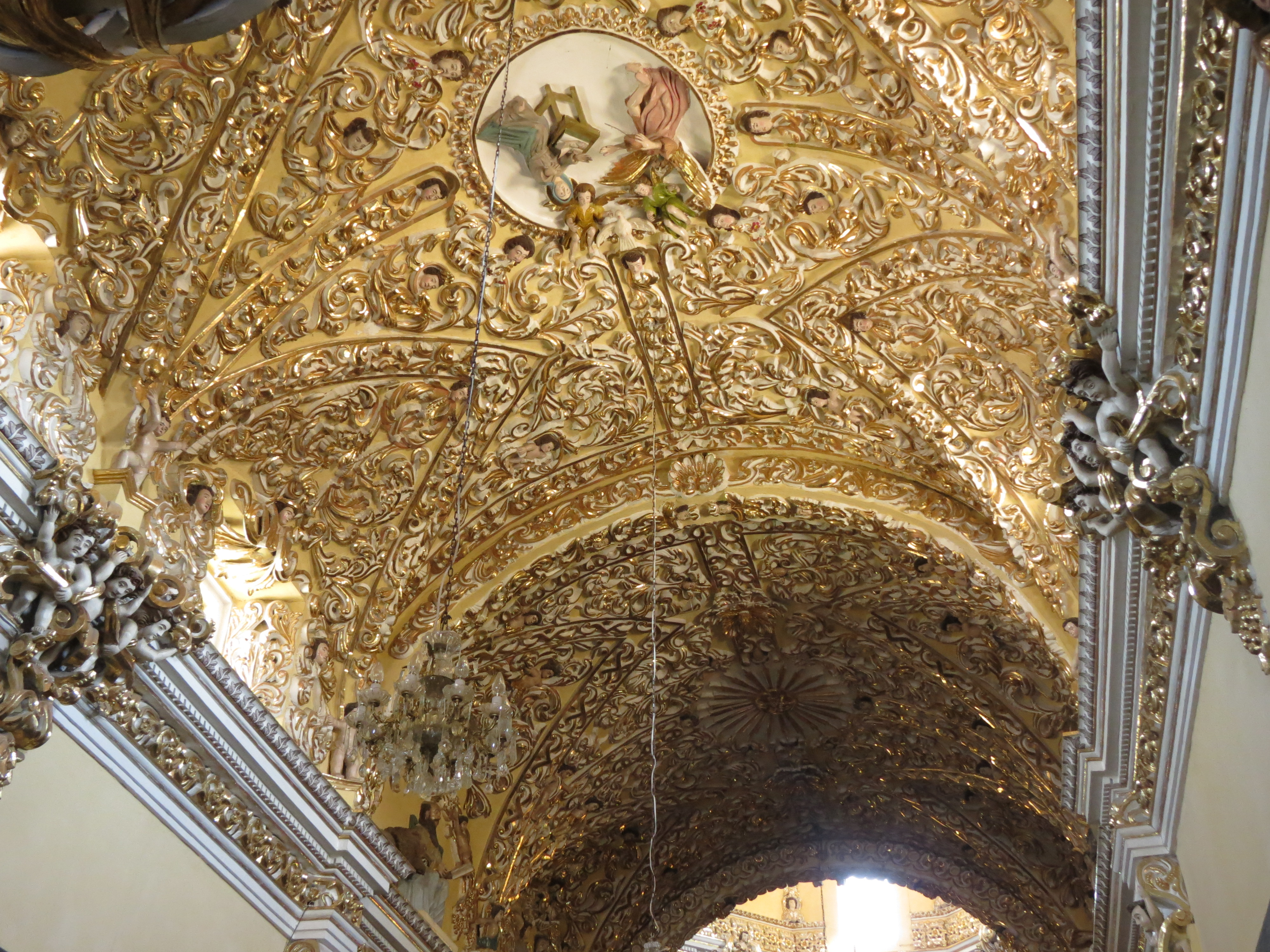

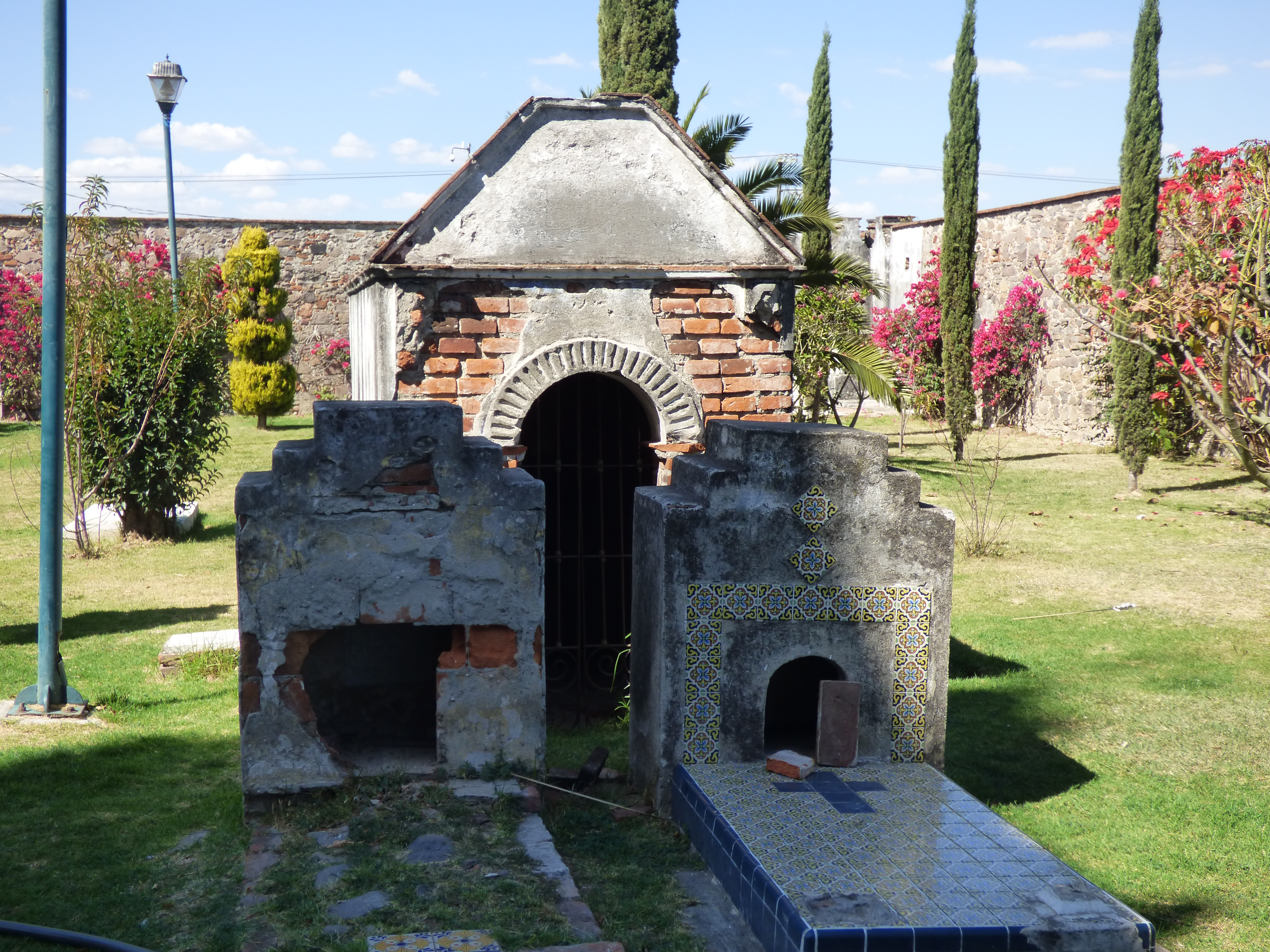
