= Jerónimo de Balbás =

Spanish architect

Jerónimo Balbás was a Spanish architect active during the 18th century. He created the altarpiece for the tabernacle of the Seville Cathedral, which was destroyed in 1824. He was also involved in working on parts of other Spanish cathedrals. In 1718, he moved to Mexico where he worked as an architect and sculptor and specialized in the Baroque architecture. He designed the Altar of Forgiveness at the Mexico City Metropolitan Cathedral.
