= José Zacarías Cora =

Mexican sculptor (1752–1816)

José Zacarías Cora (1752–1816) was a Mexican sculptor who contributed numerous sculptures to Mexican cathedrals, including the sculptures in the west bell tower of the Mexico City Metropolitan Cathedral. He was nephew and apprentice of sculptor José Antonio Villegas Cora.
