= Fábricas Universales =

Former department store building in Mexico City

Las Fábricas Universales
- The building at Venustiano Carranza and 5 de Febrero

General information
- Architectural style: Art Nouveau
- Location: Historic center of Mexico City, Venustiano Carranza and 5 de Febrero
- Coordinates: 19.43102°N 99.13445°W
- Current tenants: C&A
- Completed: 1909
- Opened: 2 August 1909
- Renovated: 1947

Design and construction
- Architect: Eugène Ewald
- Main contractor: Miguel Ángel de Quevedo

Las Fábricas Universales (Spanish for "The Universal Factories") was a department store in Mexico City. The name also refers to its Art Nouveau building at the corner of Venustiano Carranza and 5 de Febrero streets in the Historic center of Mexico City, which opened in 1909 and now houses a C&A clothing store.

The store was one of the almacenes de novedades ("department stores of new products") run by immigrants from the Barcelonnette area of the French Alps, around 20 km from the Italian border. These were known as the "Barcelonnettes" department stores.

Fábricas Universales belonged to Alexandre Reynaud. The plans were drawn in Paris by architect Eugène Ewald, and the Mexican engineer Miguel Ángel de Quevedo built it. Along with El Palacio de Hierro, Al Puerto de Veracruz and El Nuevo Mundo, it stood on one of the four corners of what are today Avenida 5 de Febrero and Calle de Venustiano Carranza, then called the "Esquina de Oro" (Golden Corner).

== History ==
=== Background ===
French migrants from the Ubaye Valley, around Barcelonnette, began arriving in Mexico in the first decades of the 19th century. Many became merchants, and later industrialists. By 1900 Mexico City had about a dozen large stores, and Las Fábricas Universales was one of them, together with El Palacio de Hierro, El Surtidor, La Francia Marítima, La Reforma del Comercio, Al Progreso Mercantil, El Puerto de Veracruz, Al Puerto de Liverpool, La Ciudad de Londres, La Bella Jardinera, El Centro Mercantil, Sorpresa y Primavera Unidas, La Nueva Bella Jardinera and Las Fábricas de Francia.

=== Alexandre Reynaud ===
Alexandre Reynaud (1840–1913) came to Mexico in 1858. He started out at a Mexico City shop called Los Dos Mundos and later worked with Édouard Gassier. Las Fábricas de Francia was founded in 1861 by Aimé Gassier and Honoré Reynaud, and in 1875 Alexandre Reynaud married Amélie Gassier. After about sixteen years in business in Mexico he retired and was active in local politics in the Ubaye (Barcelonette) valley.

In 1887 he went back into commerce and founded Las Fábricas Universales, a large store selling fabrics and novelties both wholesale and retail. Another source dates the store to 1893, at premises on the Callejuela. Reynaud was the father of the French politician Paul Reynaud. In 1896 he promoted the Santa Rosa textile mill in Veracruz and became the main partner of the Compañía Industrial Veracruzana (CIVSA), which built it. That same year he opened a purchasing office in Paris to import goods directly from European manufacturers. (Proal and Charpenel, quoting Trentini, put the Paris office, at 24 rue des Petites-Écuries, in 1897.) Quevedo, who later built the store's new building, also worked on the Santa Rosa mill in what is now Ciudad Mendoza Veracruz state. Reynaud died in 1913.

The store advertised heavily. Between 1891 and 1915 it was among the shops with the most ads in the Mexico City press, and it used the slogan bueno, bonito y barato (good, pretty and cheap).

=== The 1909 building ===
The building was designed by the Parisian architect Eugène Ewald (1850–1924), who was related to the Gassier–Reynaud families. A notice of Ewald's project appeared in Le béton armé, the journal of the Hennebique reinforced-concrete firm, in May 1907. Quevedo built it between 1907 and 1909. Silva Contreras counts five levels of sales floors; the historian Javier Pérez Siller calls it a six-story building with a dome.

By 1907 the store had outgrown its premises on the Callejuela. A description from that year says the new building would be one of the showpieces of the city, with Quevedo supervising the work, and that the opening was expected in January 1909. The store actually opened on 2 August 1909. The weekly Arte y Letras covered the opening a few days later under the title "Un palacio de la elegancia en México: Las Fábricas Universales" (A palace of elegance in Mexico: Las Fábricas Universales). The tiles on the facade were imported from the firm Gentil et Bourdet of Boulogne-Billancourt, near Paris.

Pérez Siller finds the building very similar to Le Bon Marché in Paris. Silva Contreras compares it instead with the Félix Potin store in Paris (1904), and says the facade is more rational than that one, with the American influence showing more in the rest of the design. She also notes that the job gave Quevedo experience he used on the Banco de Londres y México building (1912–1913).

=== Later years ===
In 1947 the building was remodeled and expanded. Around 1970 the corner was occupied by a store called Almacenes Blanco. A fire at the Blanco store on 13 May 1978 was attributed to an attack by the guerrilla group Unión del Pueblo. As of 2017 the building housed a C&A store. On 31 October 2016 descendants of the Gassier and Reynaud families unveiled a plaque on the corner.

== Architecture ==
The entrance is on the corner, with curved walls on both sides, a feature of the Art Nouveau style. The facade has giant-order pilasters that run up two levels, with panels of tiles with plant motifs between the floors, arched windows, and a wrought-iron railing with organic curves on the fifth level. The dome is topped by a drum decorated with plant-motif tiles; it originally carried the name "Fábricas Universales" in letters, which were later replaced by the tiles. Silva Contreras notes that the building survives in poor condition but keeps its original forms.

== See also ==
- Barcelonnette department stores of Mexico
- Fábricas de Francia
- Liverpool (store)
- El Palacio de Hierro
