= Thomas Braniff =

American-born railway manager and industrialist in Mexico (1830–1905)

- Born: Thomas Braniff Woods; 1830; Staten Island, New York, U.S.
- Died: January 22, 1905
- Resting place: Panteón Francés de la Piedad, Mexico City
- Occupations: Railway manager, industrialist, banker
- Spouse: Lorenza Ricard Werdalle
- Children: 7, including Alberto Braniff

Thomas Braniff (1830 – January 22, 1905) was an American-born railway manager, industrialist and banker in Mexico. He came to Mexico to work on the Mexican Railway between Mexico City and Veracruz, ran it for about thirty years, and became one of the richest businessmen of the Porfiriato, with large stakes in textile mills, the San Rafael paper company and the Banco de Londres y México.

== Early life ==
Braniff was born in 1830 on Staten Island, New York, the son of Thomas Braniff and Anna Woods, both Irish immigrants.

== Railway ==
Braniff came to Mexico in 1863, hired to work on the construction of the Ferrocarril Mexicano (Mexican Railway) as an employee of Smith, Knight and Company. During the Second Mexican Empire he used his position to bring in luxury goods from abroad and sell them in Mexico, some of it as contraband. As superintendent engineer he also advised on the layout of the Paseo de la Emperatriz (now Paseo de la Reforma). He is said to have favored the monarchy and to have secretly accompanied Empress Carlota to Veracruz in 1866.

After the fall of the Empire, Braniff became a shareholder and then director of the company that finished the railway. He was named director in 1874 and stayed on until shortly before his death. He was also its general manager.

== Business ==
Braniff backed the regime of Porfirio Díaz, and it was under Díaz that he made most of his fortune. Most of his money went into industry; he also invested in real estate, banking and loans, and in smaller amounts in commerce, railways, mines and haciendas.

In 1881 he built the San Lorenzo textile mill at Nogales, near Orizaba. In 1889 he was among the founding shareholders of the new Compañía Industrial de Orizaba (CIDOSA), set up with the Mexico City retailers founded by immigrants from Barcelonette, France (e.g. Al Puerto de Veracruz, El Palacio de Hierro, La Ciudad de Londres, El Puerto de Liverpool). In 1899 he and Ricardo Segura formed Segura, Braniff y Compañía, which supplied electric light to Orizaba.

In 1894 he and José Sánchez Ramos were the two founding shareholders of the San Rafael paper company; by 1899 he held 36.37% of its capital, and 22.9% in 1905. With the same partners he owned the Agrícola de Xico, which worked seven haciendas around Chalco. He led a group of Mexican investors who bought into the Banco de Londres y México.

At his death, about 45% of his invested capital was in industry, 21% in real estate, 14% in the Banco de Londres y México and 10% in loans.

== Personal life ==
Braniff married Lorenza Ricard Werdalle (1845–1934), who was born in Biarritz; she helped him connect with Mexico City's Barcelonnette community. They had seven children: Jorge, Óscar, Tomás, Arturo, Lorenza (later Marquesa de Mohernando), Rafael and the aviator Alberto Braniff.

In 1886 Braniff hired architect Charles J. S. Hall to build a house at Paseo de la Reforma 27, on a lot of about 4,300 square metres (46,000 sq ft). It went up from 1888 in a French eclectic style and had 34 rooms and large gardens. After his death it was used during the 1910 Centenary festivities and during the Revolution. The land was sold in 1932 and the house was torn down. The Reforma 27 tower by Alberto Kalach now stands on the south part of the lot.

Braniff died on January 22, 1905, and had a lavish funeral the next day. His children had a marble monument built for him at the Panteón Francés de la Piedad by architect Augusto C. Volpi.
