= Honoré Daumet =

French architect (1826–1911)

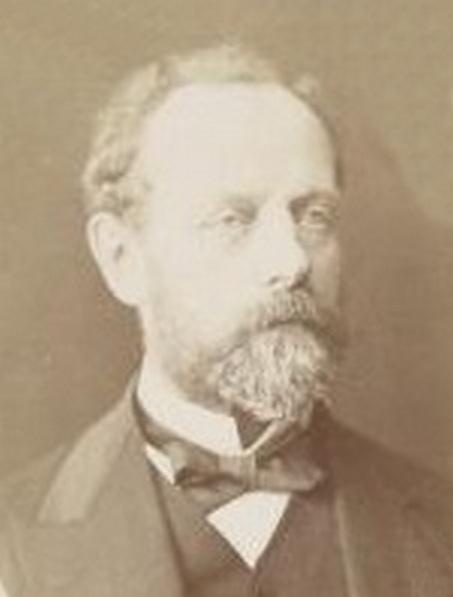
- Daumet around 1880
- Born: 23 October 1826; Paris
- Died: 12 December 1911 (aged 85); Paris
- Resting place: Montparnasse Cemetery
- Education: Beaux-Arts de Paris
- Occupation: Architect
- Awards: Prix de Rome

Signature
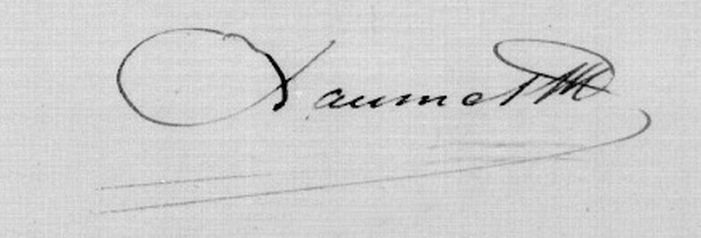

Pierre Jérôme Honoré Daumet (French pronunciation: [pjɛʁ ʒeʁom ɔnɔʁe domɛ]; 23 October 1826 – 12 December 1911) was a French architect.

== Biography ==
A student at the Beaux-Arts de Paris under Guillaume Abel Blouet, Charles-Félix Saint-Père and Émile Gilbert, he won the Grand Prix de Rome for architecture in 1855. Daumet accompanied the Archeologist Léon Heuzey on an expedition to Macedonia in 1861. On his return he married the daughter of the architect Charles Questel.

Daumet founded his own atelier which would produce nine further Grand Prix winners, Charles-Louis Girault chief among them, and attracted a number of foreign students such as Charles McKim and Austin W. Lord.

In 1908, Daumet won the Royal Gold Medal of the Royal Institute of British Architects.

He was a close friend of the sculptor Henri Chapu. Daumet died on 12 December 1911 at his home in the 6th arrondissement of Paris, and was buried in the 15th division of Montparnasse Cemetery.

== Works ==
- Extension and western front of the Palais de Justice in Paris (1857–1868) with Joseph-Louis Duc
- Reconstruction of the Château de Chantilly (1875–1882) for Henri d'Orléans, Duke of Aumale.
- Basilica of Sacré Coeur (1884–1886). Daumet was the first of five successive architects who completed the building after the death of Paul Abadie. He was followed by Charles Laisné in 1886.
- Grenoble, Palais de Justice, Palais des Facultés
- Restoration of the Villa Tiburtine
- Construction of the boarding school of Sion in Tunis
- Grandstands of the Chantilly Racecourse (1879)
- Restoration of the Roman theatre of Orange
- Restoration of Château de Saint-Germain-en-Laye
- Restoration of the chapel of the Palace of Versailles
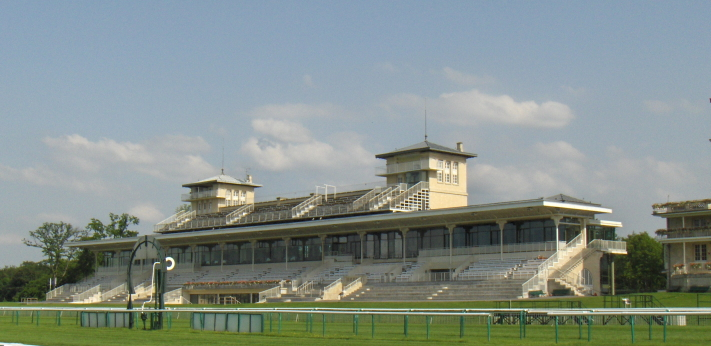
  Hippodrome de Chantilly
