= Jean-Louis Pascal =

French architect

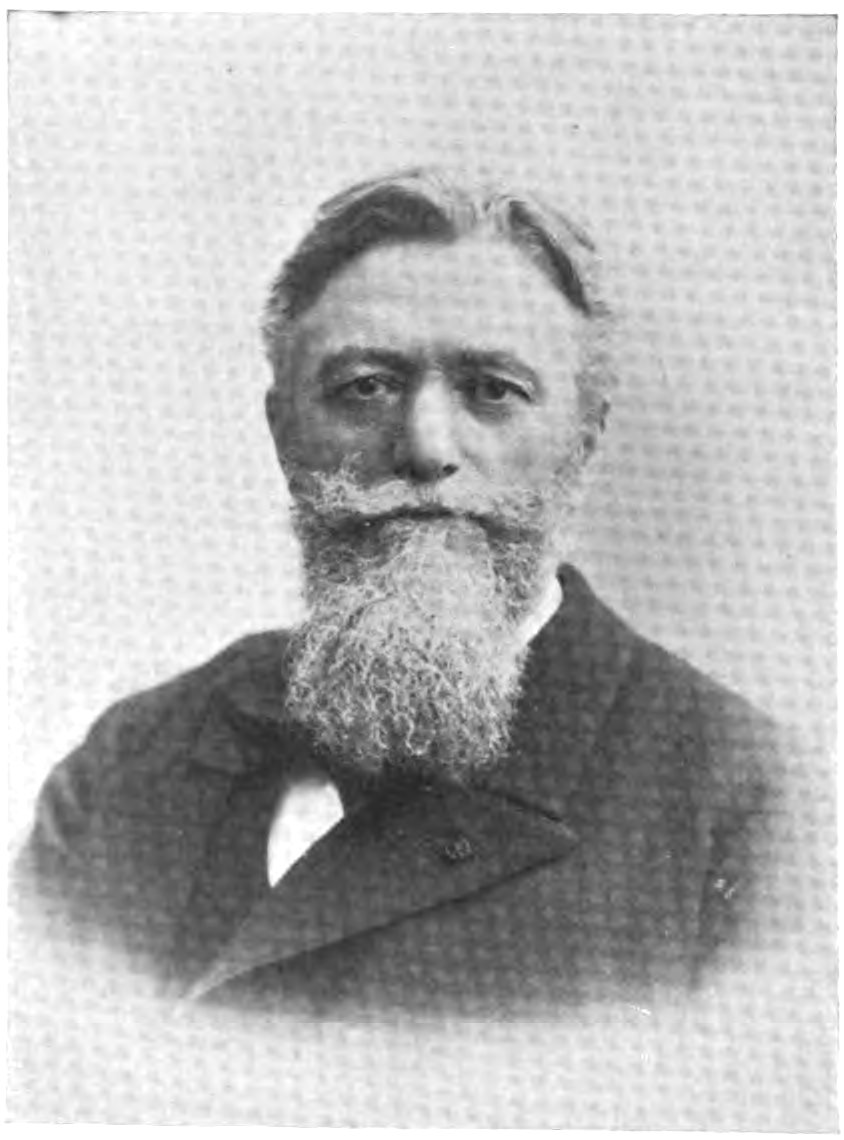
Jean-Louis Pascal

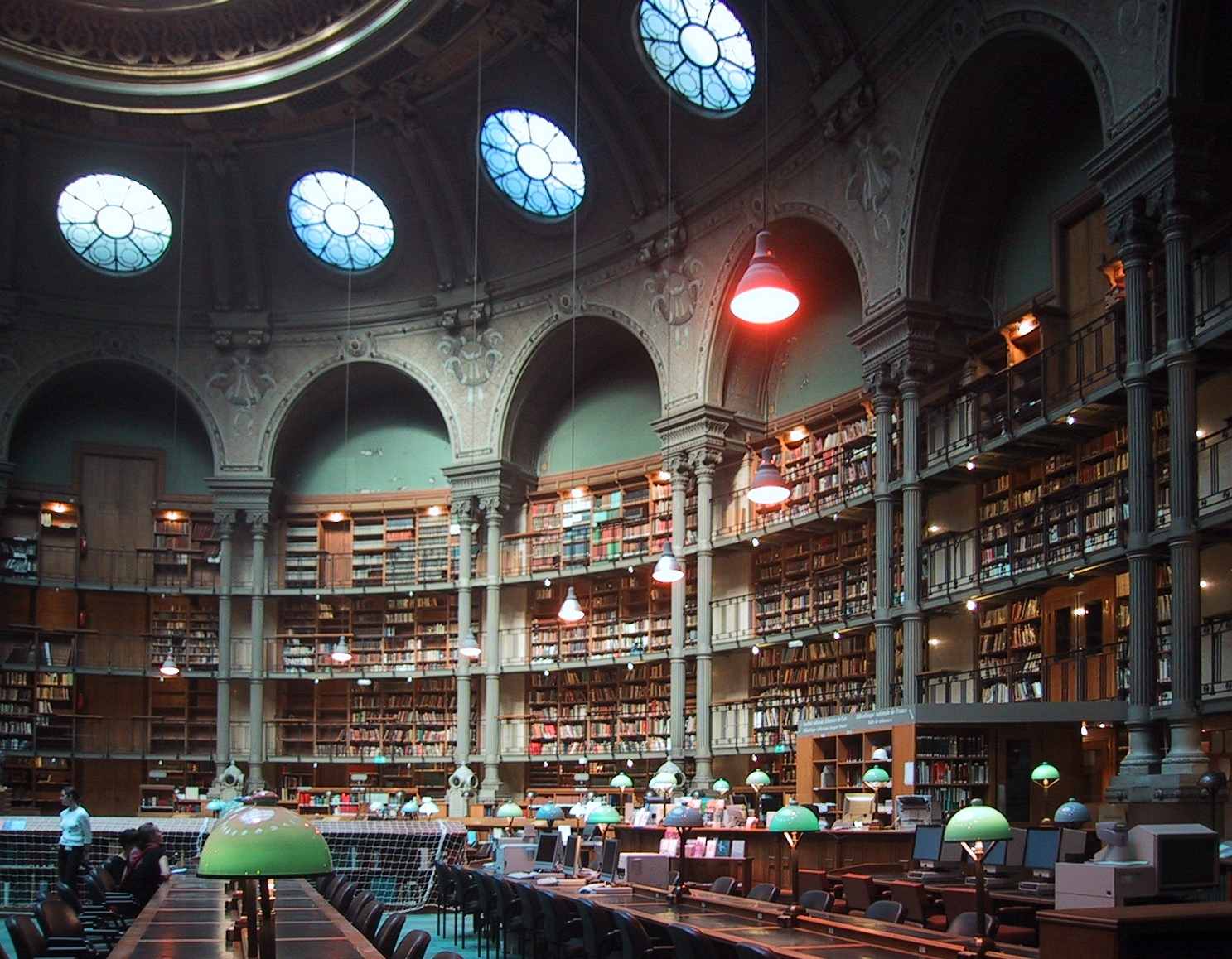
Oval Room, National Library of France, 1916

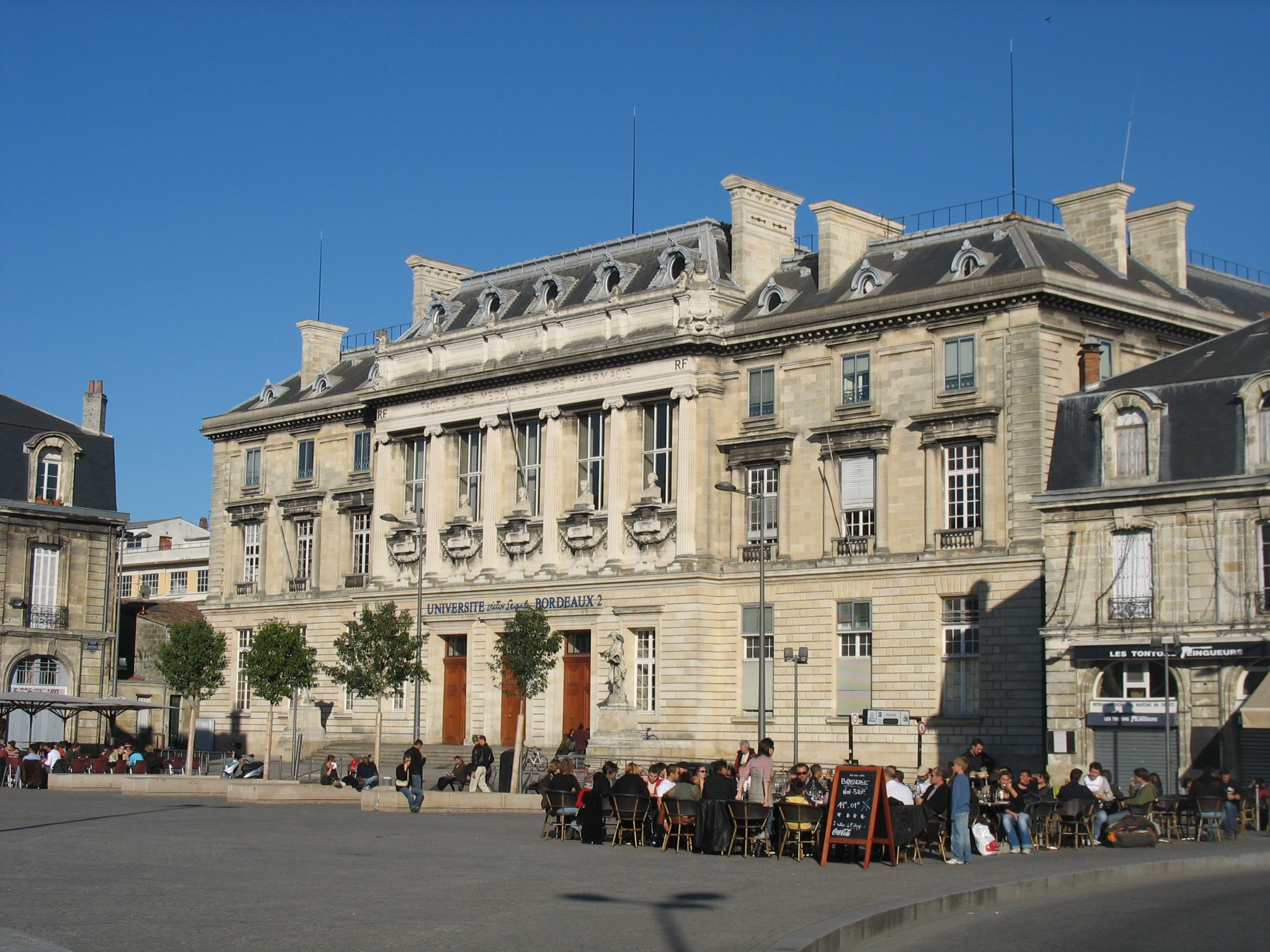
Medical and Pharmacy School, Victory Square, Bordeaux

Jean-Louis Pascal (4 June 1837 – 17 May 1920) was an academic French architect.

== Life ==
Born in Paris, Pascal was taught at the École nationale supérieure des Beaux-Arts by Émile Gilbert and Charles-Auguste Questel. He won the Grand Prix de Rome for Architecture in 1866, which put him in residency at the Villa Medici in Rome from 1867 through 1870.

After brief service in the Franco-Prussian War, he returned to Paris to assist Hector Lefuel with the restoration of the Louvre, and succeeded Questel as the head of his own old atelier. In 1875, his star rising in the academy system, Pascal was appointed the head architect for the National Library of France upon the death of the previous architect, Henri Labrouste. Pascal brought this long project nearly to completion, contributing interiors and exteriors, the Oval Room, the Salon Voltaire, the periodical room, and the grand staircase.

His other major work includes many monuments and memorial throughout France, the residence and studio of French painter William-Adolphe Bouguereau, 75 rue Notre-Dame-des-Champs, Paris, finished in 1868, and the tomb of Jules Michelet at Père Lachaise Cemetery in 1893.

In 1914, Pascal was awarded both the American AIA Gold Medal in 1914 (the fourth ever awarded) and the Royal Gold Medal of the Royal Institute of British Architects. He died in Paris.

== Influence ==
Pascal may have had his greatest influence as a teacher, both for French architects and particularly for international students who adapted the lessons of the Beaux-Arts to their home countries. Pascal's atelier was credited with a total of four grand prizes and fifteen second prizes while he was patron.

Among Pascal's many students were:

- the French-American Paul Philippe Cret
- the French architect Eugène Ewald
- the French-American Constant-Désiré Despradelle, who educated a further generation of student as professor of architecture at MIT
- the Scottish Sir John James Burnet
- the American Charles Collens
- the American Guy Lowell
- the Canadian William Sutherland Maxwell
- the Canadian Ernest Cormier
- Henri Paul Nénot
- Henri Sauvage
- Charles Mewès
- Eugene Bourdon (architect)
- Arnold Higuer

== Sources ==
- The American architect from the colonial era to the present By Cecil D. Elliott
