= Al Puerto de Veracruz =

Former department store in Mexico City

- The Mexico City store building, now occupied by La Parisina
- Industry: Retail
- Founded: 1880 in Mexico City
- Founder: Léon and Antoine Signoret
- Fate: Closed
- Headquarters: Mexico City, Mexico
- Area served: Mexico City, Puebla
- Products: Clothing, fabrics, silks, furniture, home decoration, wines

Al Puerto de Veracruz Mexico City

General information
- Location: SE corner of Venustiano Carranza and 5 de Febrero streets
- Coordinates: 19.43084°N 99.13475°W

Al Puerto de Veracruz Puebla

General information
- Location: 4 Poniente and 5 de Mayo streets
- Coordinates: 19.046°N 98.1975°W

Al Puerto de Veracruz ("To the Port of Veracruz"), also El Puerto de Veracruz, was a department store in the Historic center of Mexico City, on the corner of 5 de Febrero and Venustiano Carranza streets. It also had a store in Puebla. It was founded in 1880 by immigrants from Barcelonnette, France, and was one of the big French-owned stores of the Porfiriato, along with El Palacio de Hierro, El Puerto de Liverpool and El Correo Francés. The Mexico City building is now a La Parisina fabric store.

== History ==
Léon (León) Signoret was born in Barcelonnette in 1857 and came to Mexico in 1878. He first worked at Las Fábricas de Francia, a Mexico City clothing and import store. In 1880 he and his brother Antoine (Antonio) founded El Puerto de Veracruz. In 1885 Signoret set up the firm Signoret, Honnorat y Cía. with Léon Honnorat, and it then ran the store. The store sold clothing, silks, fabrics, furniture, home decoration and wines.

Proal and Charpenel give 1873 as the year Signoret arrived in Mexico, not 1878, and say he left Las Fábricas de Francia to start the store, first with Antoine as Signoret Hermanos and then with Honnorat. Former employees interviewed for their book describe it as a big store that also had its own factories, selling fabrics, safes, umbrellas and a bit of everything, at retail and wholesale; the wholesale side let it supply other stores around the country. One employee who started there in the 1920s says it then belonged to Signoret, Honnorat y Cía.; by the time of the interviews it belonged to a Spitalier from Meyronnes, in the Ubaye Valley.

In the 1890s it advertised new fashions arriving "by the steamers of each month" and had a shipping service for customers in the interior of the country.

In 1889 Signoret, Honnorat y Cía. joined Thomas Braniff and two other Barcelonnette houses, J. Tron y Cía. (El Palacio de Hierro) and Ollivier y Cía. (La Ciudad de Londres), in forming the Compañía Industrial de Orizaba, a textile company. Signoret also sat on the boards of the Banco de Londres y México, the San Rafael paper mill and the Monterrey iron and steel foundry, among others.

== Buildings ==
=== Mexico City ===
Construction of the store's building on the corner of Capuchinas and Monterilla streets (now Venustiano Carranza and 5 de Febrero) began in 1895. At the end of the 1930s it was replaced by a modern building, which reused the steel structure. The store was still open in the mid-1980s. As of 2017 the building was a La Parisina fabric store.

=== Puebla ===
The Puebla store was on the corner of 4 Poniente and 5 de Mayo streets in the historic center. Its building went up in the 1950s and was one of the first modern buildings in the city center, and one of the first with underground parking. The store sold European, American and Mexican goods to middle- and upper-class shoppers. Telediario says it was run by Spanish businessmen based in Veracruz. During the 1990s the store was known for multiple Santa Claus figures that appeared to be climbing the building. It closed toward the end of the 20th century after more than forty years, and the building then became a bazaar selling knock-off clothing, sneaker and pirated movies and music, now focusing on cellular phones and accessories named Centro Comercial 5 de Mayo.

== See also ==
- French Mexicans
