= Forum Buenavista =

Shopping center in Mexico City

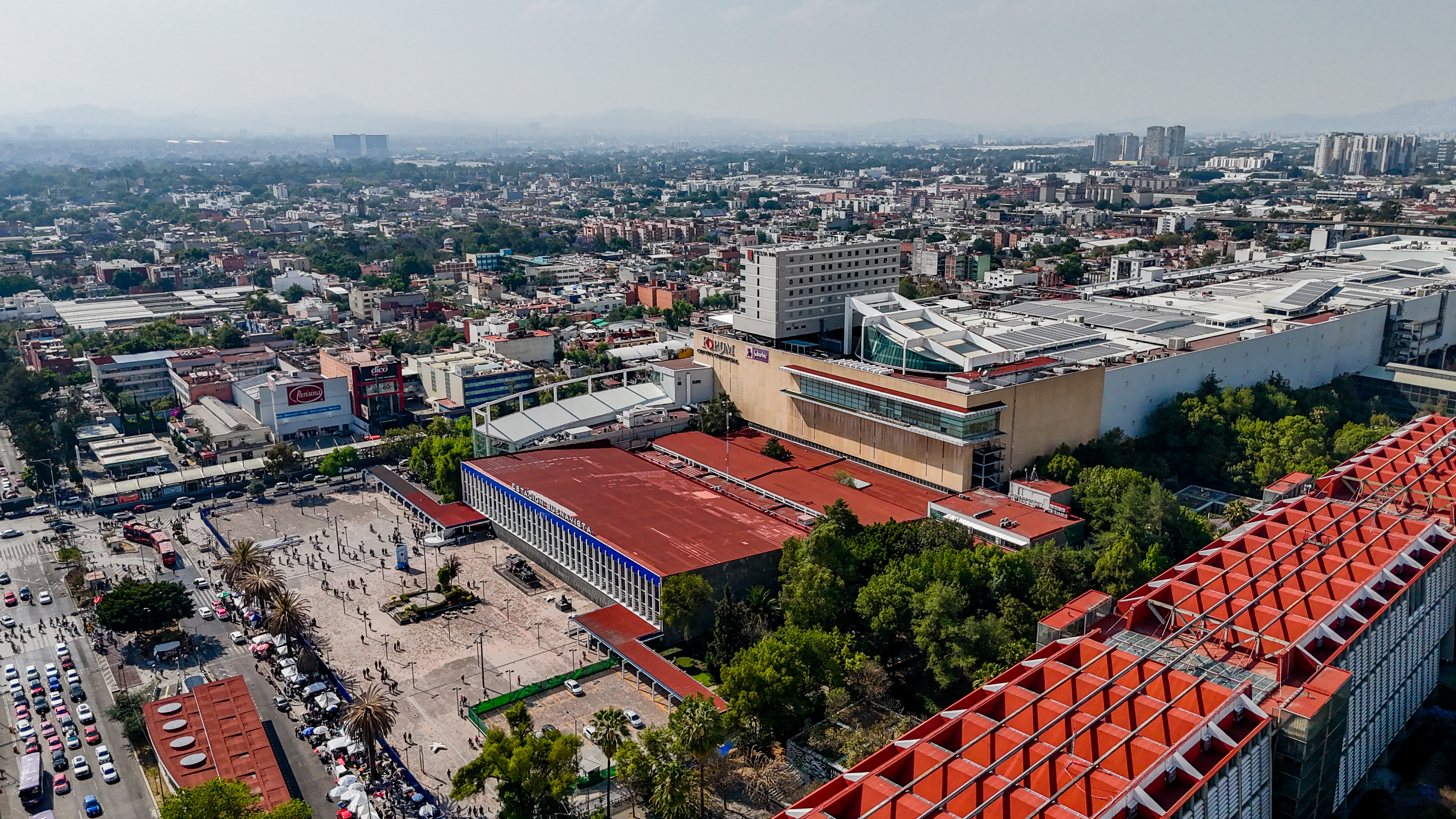
Aerial view of Forum Buenavista. In its front is the Buenavista railway station

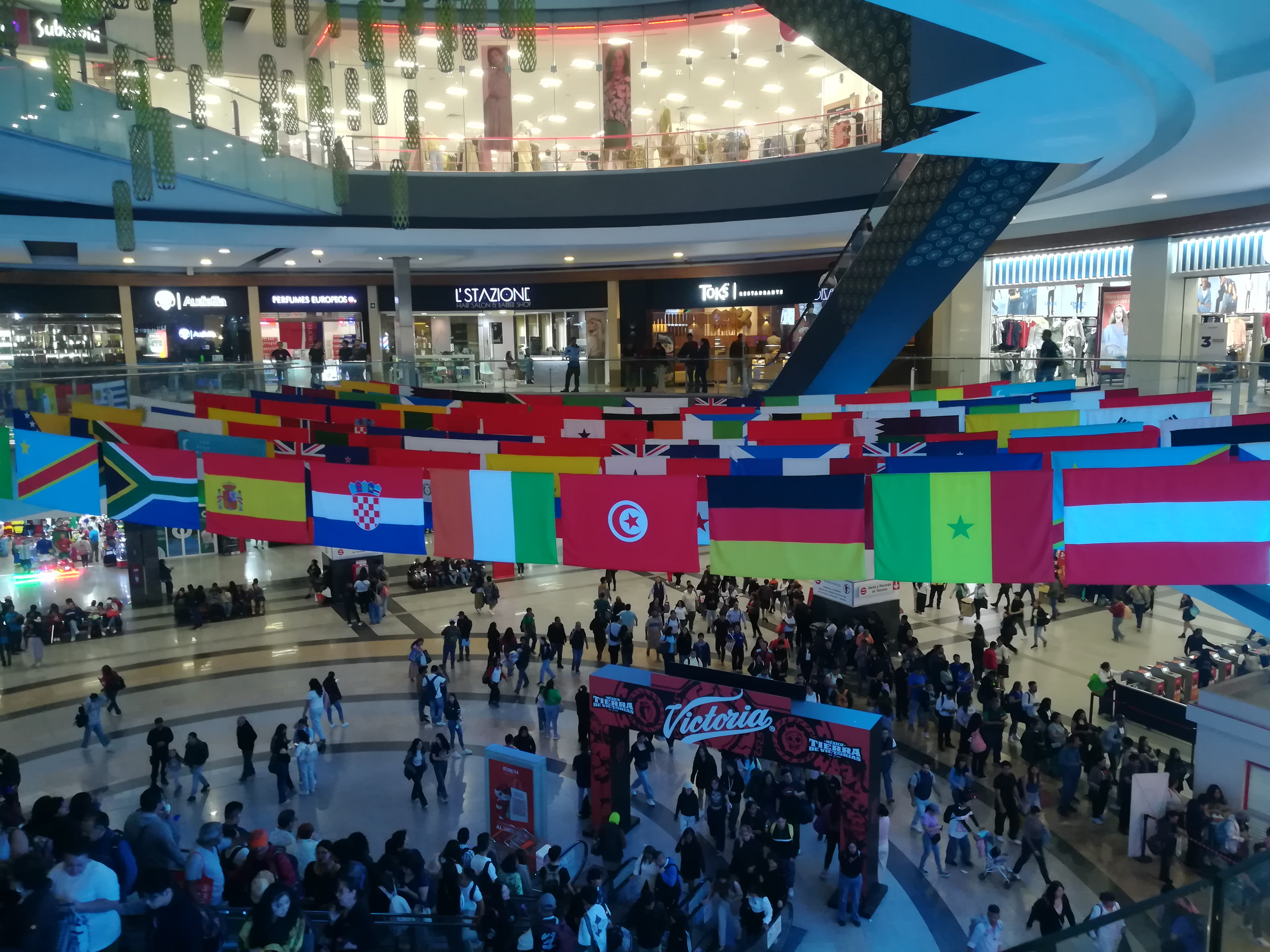
Forum Buenavista during the 2026 FIFA World Cup year

Forum Buenavista is a 37,250-square-metre (401,000 sq ft) shopping mall built atop the Buenavista Station in Colonia Buenavista, central Mexico City, where Avenida de los Insurgentes meets Eje 1 Norte. It was developed by GICSA, opened in 2009, and as of 2015 it was one of the ten largest malls in Greater Mexico City. While the train station and tracks occupy the ground floor, the mall occupies three floors above, stretching 400 meters from south to north.

It is anchored by the Sears, Fábricas de Francia, and Coppel department stores; Best Buy, Soriana hypermarket, Sanborns, Muebles Dico furniture, Cinépolis multicinemas, Old Navy, H&M, and more than 50 freestanding and food-court restaurants, including Applebee's and Chili's.

== Criticism ==
The center has only one pedestrian entrance at its southwest corner, to the north of which the building fronts the city's iconic Avenida de los Insurgentes boulevard with a 500-meter-long parking garage, with entrances only for cars. Alejandro Hernández, editor of Arquine, stated that Forum Buenavista "is an example of architecture that does nothing but decompose its environment. It shows contempt for the city and its inhabitants, and creates an unforgiving and hostile cityscape for pedestrians. If Insurgentes, being 30 meters wide, is already unsettling for the pedestrian, then decorating its sides with car-prisons makes it the end of the pedestrian."
