= Church of St. Philibert, Tournus =

Medieval church in France

Coordinates: 46°33′56.09″N 4°54′32.79″E

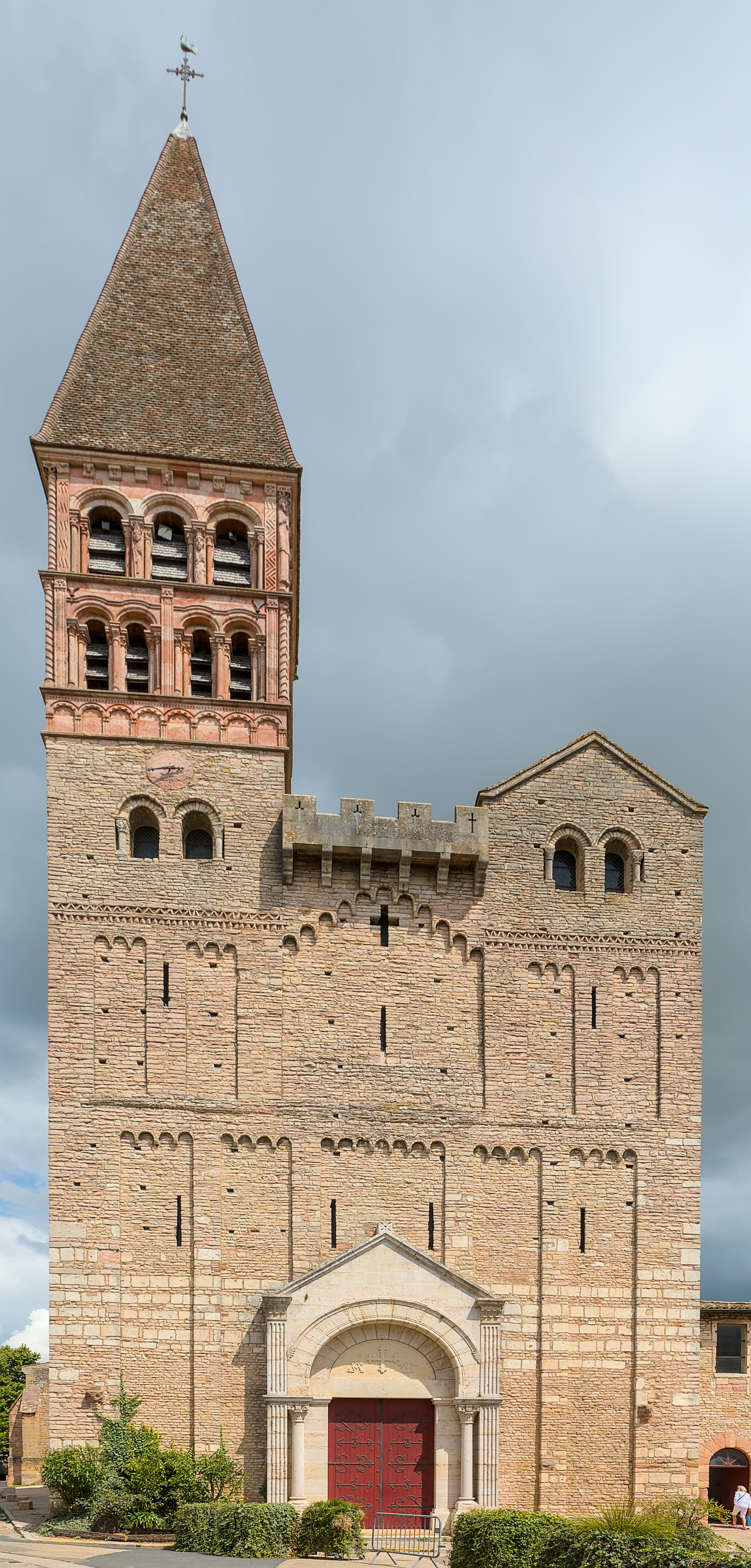
St. Philibert's Church in Tournus

The Church of St. Philibert, Tournus is a medieval church, the main surviving building of a former Benedictine abbey, the Abbey of St. Philibert, in Tournus, Saône-et-Loire, France. It is of national importance as an example of Romanesque architecture.

== History ==
In 875 Charles the Bald gave Tournus to a community of monks who came to the locality with the relics of Saint Philibert. The monks had fled Viking raids on Noirmoutier, and had previously stopped at Saint-Philbert-de-Grand-Lieu. Noirmoutier was the location of the first recorded Viking raid on continental Europe, when raiders attacked the monastery in 799. Around 863 the monk Ermentarius wrote a history of the transfer of the monastery and the relics of Philibert of Jumièges.

The abbey was damaged by the Hungarian invasion of 936/937.

The abbey was closed in the seventeenth century and St. Philibert became a collegiate church. Like many other churches in France, it was secularised as a Temple of Reason during the French Revolution. Roman Catholic worship resumed after the Concordat of 1801 formally ended the period of dechristianisation.

== Architecture ==
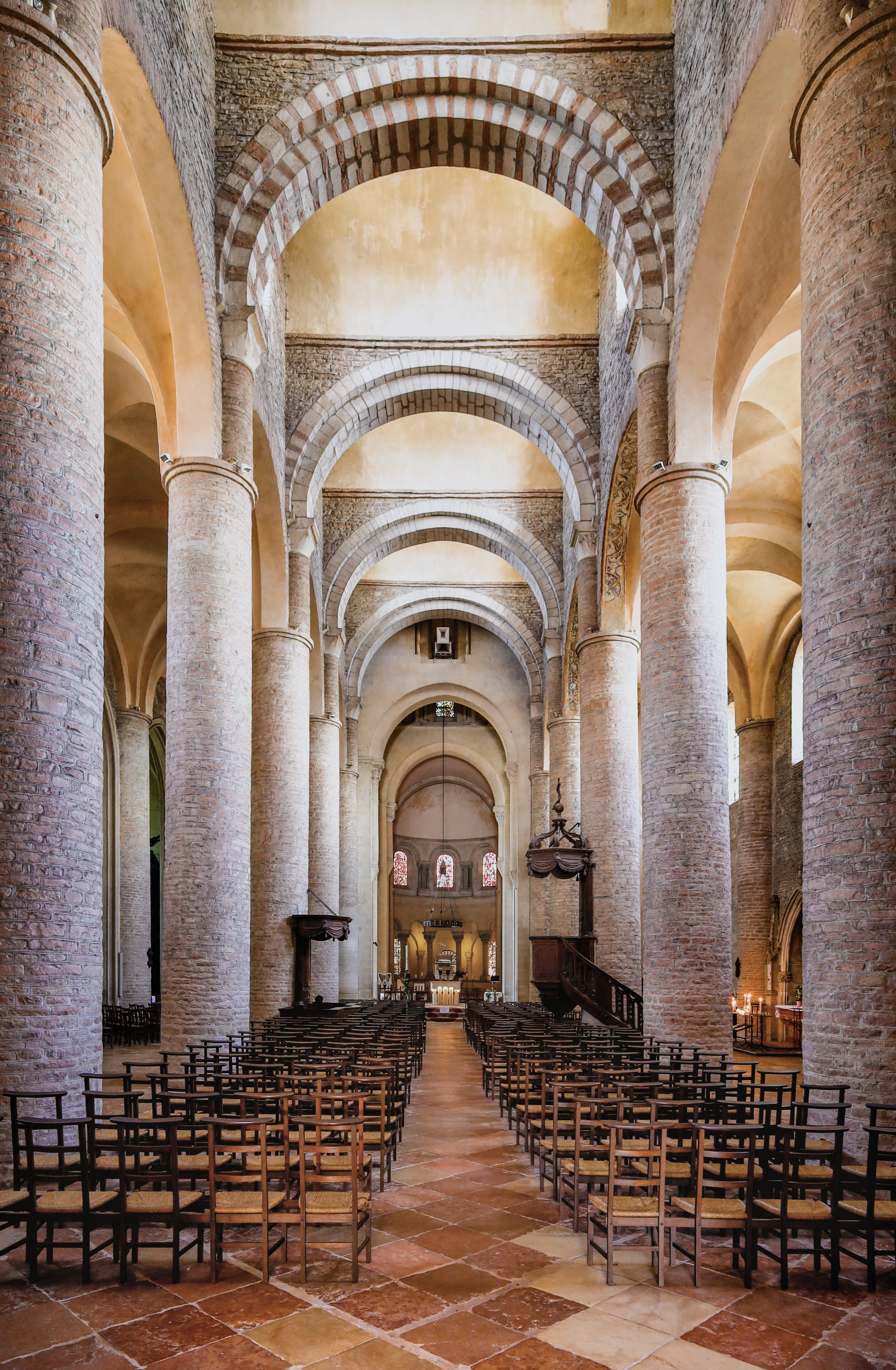
Transverse barrel vaulted nave with groin vaulted aisles

According to a tradition, a tenth-century abbot began construction of the present building. Some sources follow tradition in suggesting that construction began before 1000. However, current thinking is that the earliest parts of the church are eleventh century. It is in the early First Romanesque style of Burgundy, which began to use further Romanesque and early Gothic styles during the beginning of the 11th century.

The church is set in a fortified enclosure, and defence was evidently a factor in the design of the building. The west front can be described as "lithic" in that it has heavy masonry walls and few windows.

=== Interior ===
The nave is roofed with barrel vaulting, supported on tall cylindrical columns. The barrel vault is unusual in that it is transversal: instead of one long barrel running along nave, the vault consists of multiple smaller barrels running across the nave. This arrangement helps the engineering by avoiding lateral thrust but it "is not beautiful and was never repeated."

== Conservation ==
The church was included in the list of historic monuments of 1840. Like others on the list, the building required conservation work which it received under the direction of the preservationist architect Charles-Auguste Questel.

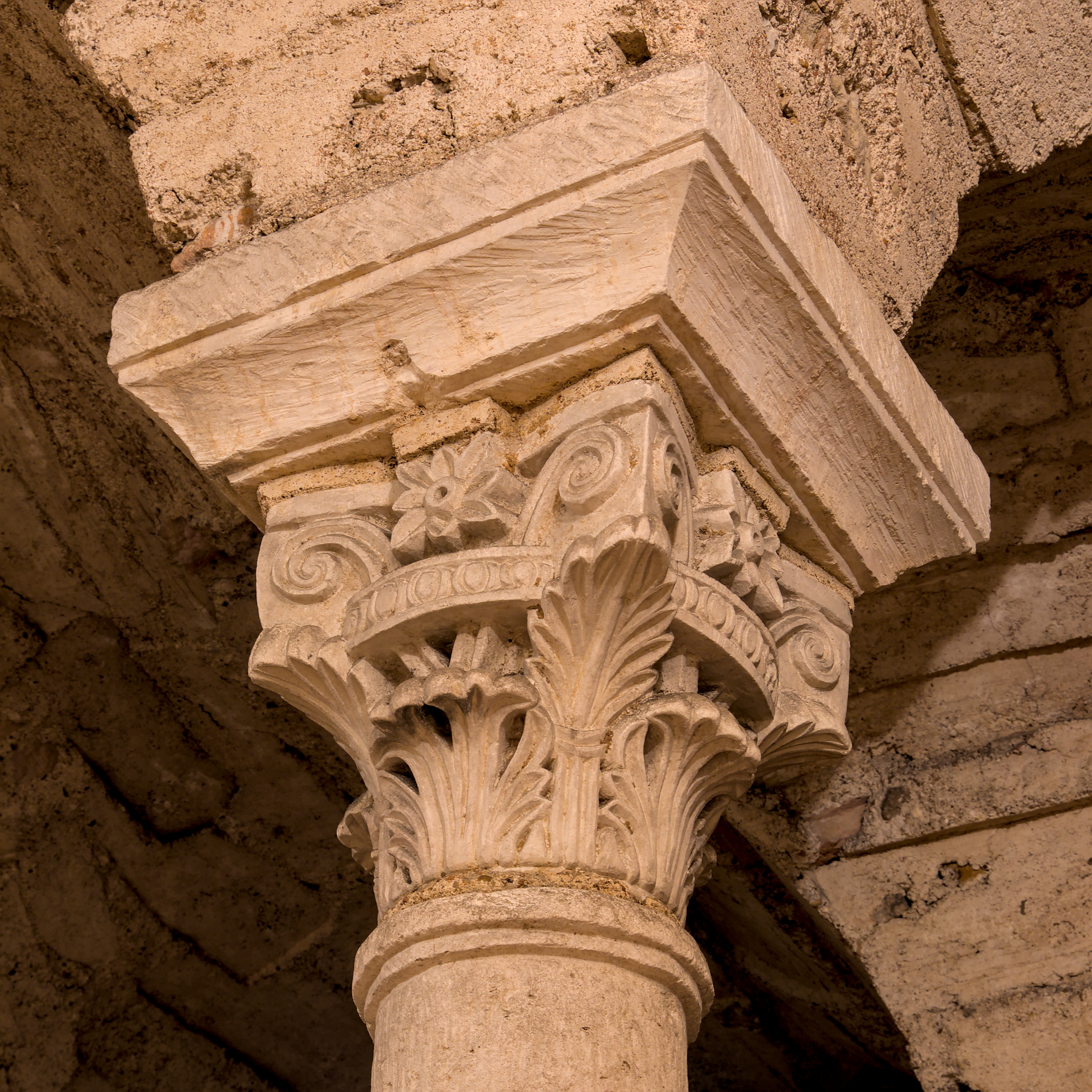
Capital (crypt)

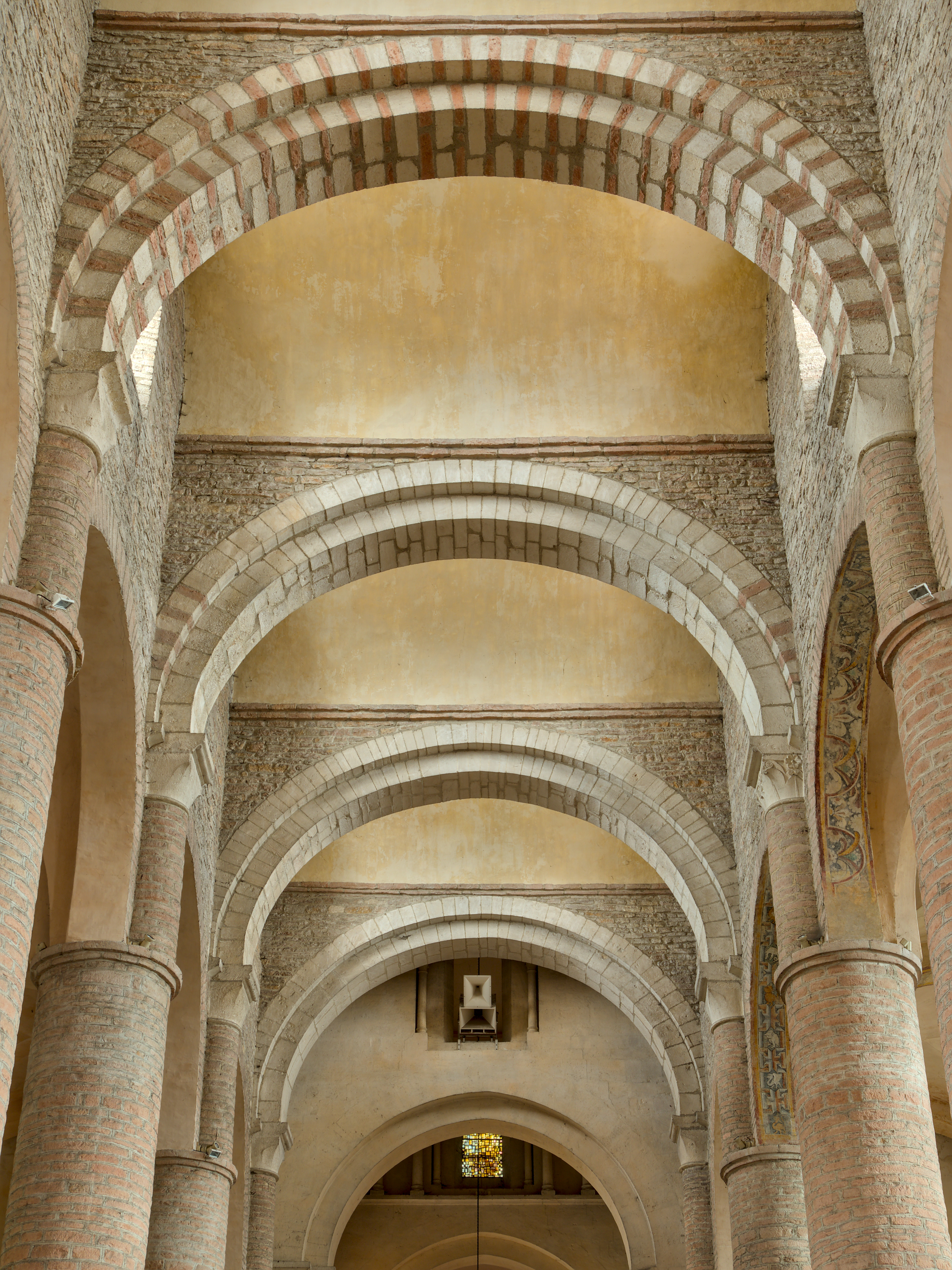
Vaults in the nave

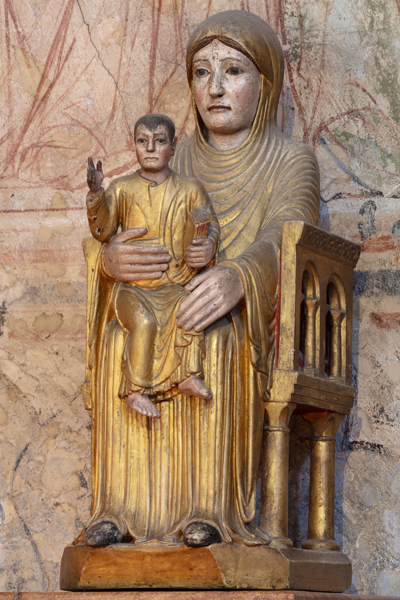
Black Madonna
(12th c.)

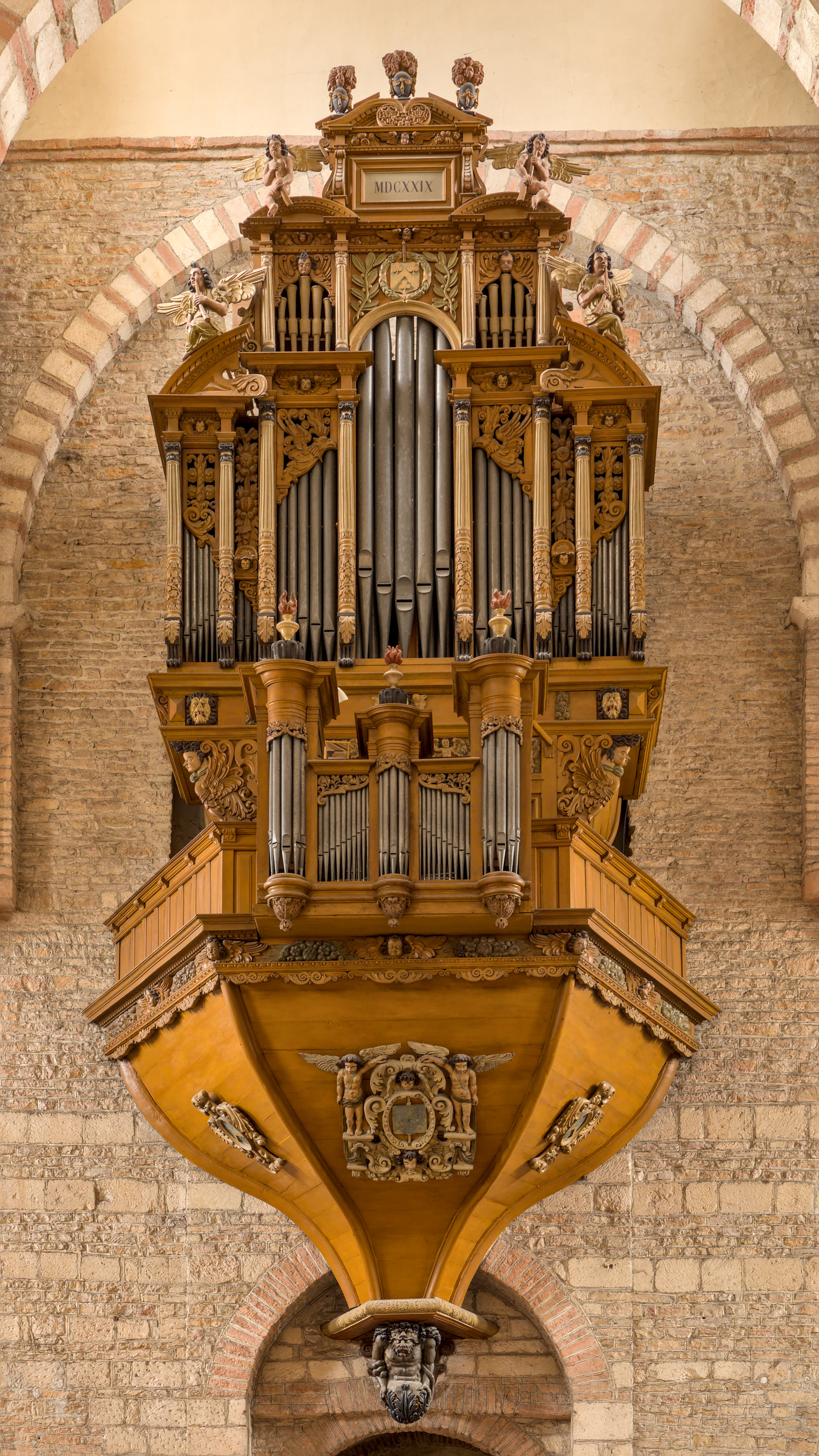
Organ

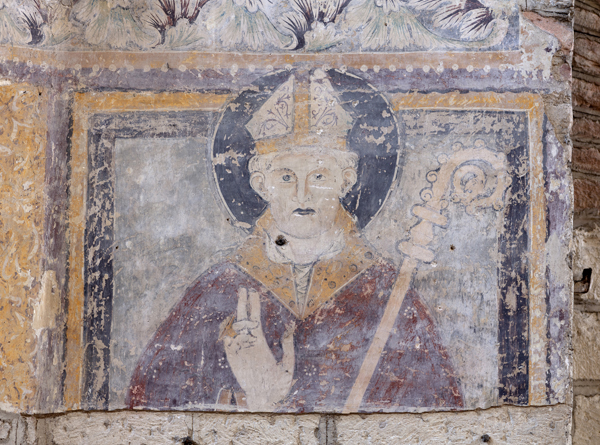
Fresco

== See also ==
- French Romanesque architecture
- High medieval domes
- Church of Saint-Philbert-de-Grand-Lieu
- Saint-Philibert de Noirmoutier Abbey

== Books ==
- Curé, Henri; Virey, Jean (1905). Saint-Philibert de Tournus (in French). Paris: A. Picard. p. 503.
- Juenin, Pierre (1733). Tournus. Nouvelle Histoire de l'abbaye de St-Filibert et de la ville de Tournus (in French). Dijon: Antoine de Fay.
- Miré, Georges de; Valléry-Radot, J. (1955). Saint-Philibert de Tournus. Inventaire monumental, vol. 1 (in French). Paris.
