= Ermentar of Noirmoutier =

Ermentar of Noirmoutier, also called Ermentarius Tornusiensis (died mid-860s), was a monk and historian of the abbey of Saint-Philibert de Tournus. He wrote a vivid prose chronicle, De translationibus et miraculis sancti Filiberti, recounting the disruption of his community by Viking raids and its transfer from the Breton island of Noirmoutier to several locations in France before it was finally settled at Tournus in 875 (after his death). It is framed around the transfer of the relics of the abbey's patron, Saint Philibert of Jumièges, and the miracles he performed on the abbey's behalf.

Ermentar was a monk under Hilbod, who became abbot of Noirmoutier in exile around 826. The monks had begun construction on a new monastery in the villa of Déas under Hilbod's predecessor, Arnoul, who died in 824/5. It was there around 839 that Ermentar wrote his first work, the Vita sancti Filiberti, a life of Saint Philibert based on an earlier seventh-century biography. In 847, the monks abandoned Déas for Cunault. In 862, they abandoned Cunault for Messay in Aquitaine, where Philibert's relics arrived on 1 May. This was the occasion when Ermentar began writing the De translationibus. Abbot Hilbod died that year and was succeeded for a short time by an abbot named Ermentar. Unfortunately, there is no record of whether the abbot and the historian are one and the same. The historian had died by the mid-860s.

Ermentar records the first Viking raid on continental Europe against his monastery in 799. According to him, from 819 the monks were forced to spend summers on the mainland because of the Vikings. In 836, they finally relocated inland permanently and in 843 the Vikings took over Noirmoutier and made it their base for a series of raids into France. Ermentar's history is a valuable, but not entirely trustworthy, source. He wrote with outrage about the ferocity of the pagans.
