= Les Bains Douches (nightclub) =

Former nightclub in Paris

Coordinates: 48.86°N 2.35°E

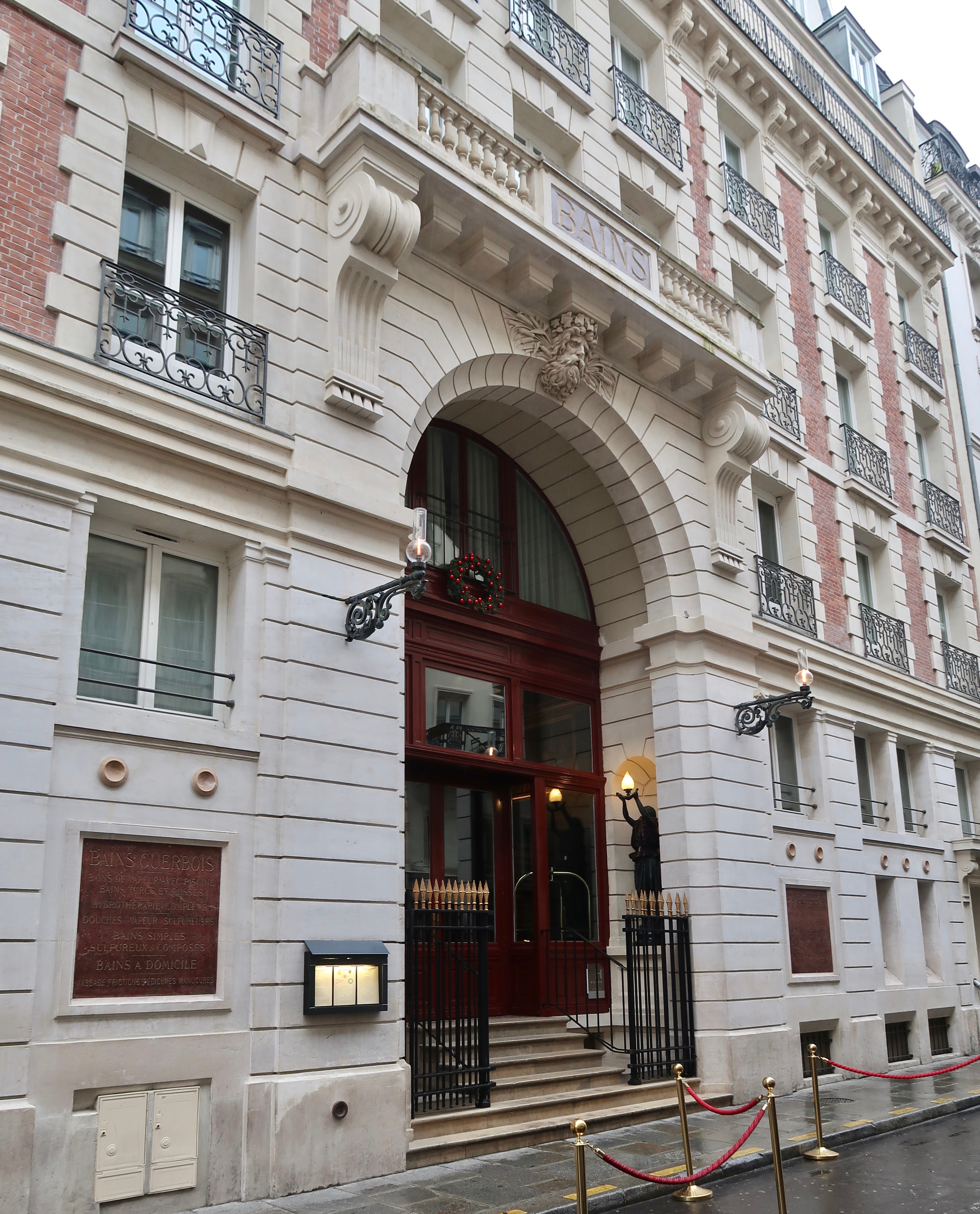
Entrance to Les Bains Douches in Paris

Les Bains Douches (roughly translated as "The Bathhouses" or "The Public Baths") (aka Bains Douches) was a Parisian nightclub located at 7 rue du Bourg-l'Abbé in the 3rd arrondissement of Paris which was active from 1978 to 2010. Bains Douches was a mecca of decadent excess for Parisian nightclubbers during the 1980s, and a meeting place for creatives and artists from throughout society. The nightclub closed its doors in 2010.

== History ==
The building originally houses the Guerbois thermal baths, created in 1885 by François Auguste Guerbois (1824–1891) and his son Albert Guerbois (1857–1926), who also operated the Guerbois café, a popular meeting place for artists and intellectuals at the time. It was immortalized by Édouard Manet. The plaque at the entrance of Les Bains Douches indicates: Bains Guerbois, swimming pool, Turkish and Russian baths, sulfurous steam showers.

Near the end of the 19th century, the place attracted many influential homosexual personalities, including Marcel Proust. Jean-Pierre Marois, historic owner of the place, founded the company Les Bains in 2011 as part of the renovation of the new project.

The baths were rebuilt in 1913 to designs by the architect Eugène Ewald.

=== Opening as a club ===
Maurice Marois bought the place as a cesspool at the end of the 1960s before transferring the lease many years later. The shabby-chic club Bains Douches was established in 1978 by Jacques Renault, an antique dealer and his partner Fabrice Coat. They transformed the baths into a modular nightclub with a lounge on the first floor.

Philippe Starck, then just starting out, re-decorated the place in white and black tiles. Later, David Rochline retouched the appearance of the entrance. The swimming pool in the basement had a giant chessboard at the bottom of the water, the pieces of which were moved by a frogman. Added to this was a concert hall, discotheque, restaurant and bar. It opened to much fanfare on December 21, 1978, with more than 2,000 people present. Pierre et Gilles designed the invitation card.

=== Post-punk rock days ===
Far from the ostentatiousness disco trend of the moment, Bains Douches became the meeting point for the world of no wave cultural intellectuals and artists. Disc jockey/singer Philippe Krootchey hosted a large number of evenings there featuring the music of Talking Heads and The B-52s. Depeche Mode gave its first concert in France at Bains Douches in September 1981. Other hosted live music performances were by the Dead Kennedys, Joy Division, Suicide, Les Rita Mitsouko, The Jesus and Mary Chain, Echo and the Bunnymen, and others. Joy Division recorded their Les Bains Douches 18 December 1979 LP there and the CD booklet contains a reprint of the original poster for the show. Also the No Wave band James Chance & the Contortions recorded their album Live Aux Bains Douches there in 1980.

Farida Khelfa was the club's physiognomist for two years before being replaced for a time by Caroline Loeb and Paquita Paquin. Transgender icon Jenny Bel'Air also worked the door for a while. Regular club goers included Roman Polanski, Johnny Depp, Naomi Campbell, Mick Jagger, Kate Moss, David Bowie and Jean-Charles de Castelbajac.

== See also ==
- CBGB
- Le Palace
- Mudd Club
- Tier 3
