= Charles-Auguste Questel =

French architect and teacher

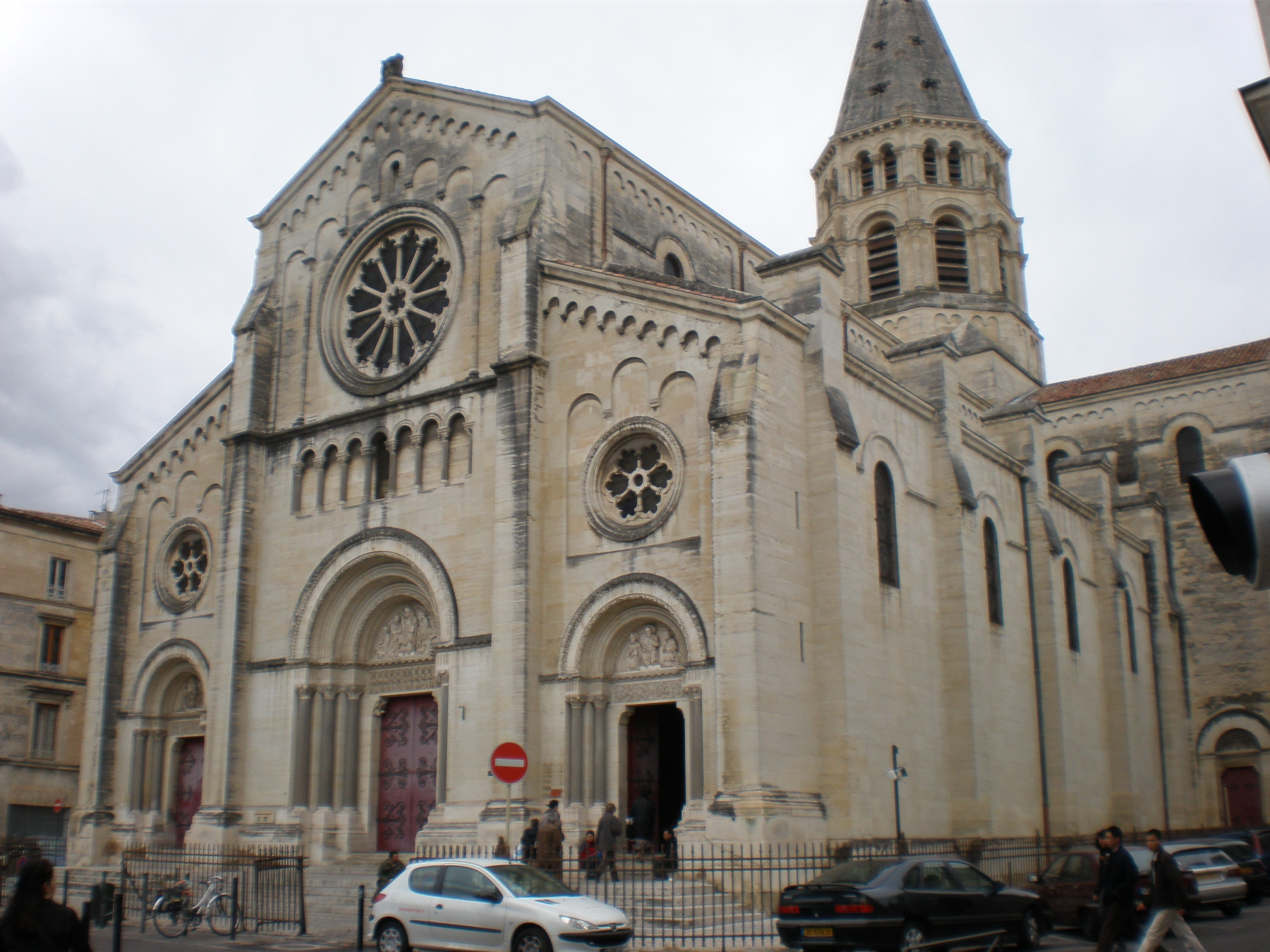
Saint Paul Church, Nîmes, 1835-1849

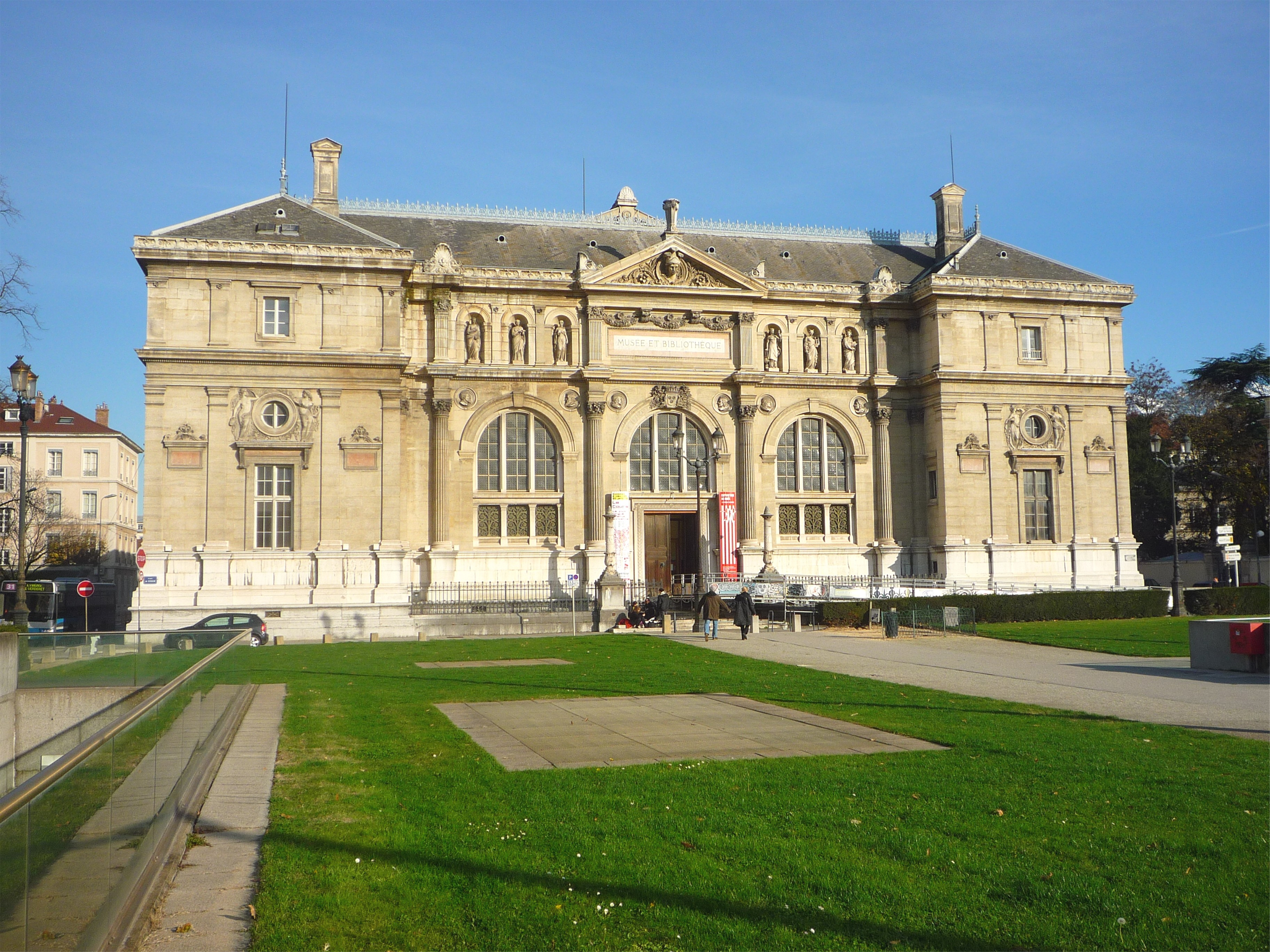
Library and Museum of Grenoble, 1872

Charles-Auguste Questel (19 September 1807 – 30 January 1888) was a French architect and teacher. As well as designing new buildings, his projects included the preservation of historical monuments. He worked on several historical monuments included in France's first list of such structures, the list of 1840.

== Biography ==
Born in Paris, Questel was a student of Félix Duban at the École nationale supérieure des Beaux-Arts, and took a second-place Prix de Rome in 1844. He became a member of the Académie des Beaux-Arts in 1871.

Questel became the patron of his own atelier at the Ecole. Among his students were Henri Paul Nénot, Ernest Sanson, James Freret, Eugène Train, Eugène Ewald and the Swiss architect Alfred Friedrich Bluntschli; he was the father-in-law of French architect Honoré Daumet.

Questel died in Paris. Upon his death the atelier was taken over by Jean-Louis Pascal.

== Works ==
His architectural work includes:

=== New buildings ===
- the church of Saint-Paul in Nîmes built from 1835 through 1849
- the Pradier Fountain, Nîmes, 1851 (in collaboration with James Pradier)
- the Saint Anne Hospital in Paris, 1867
- Préfecture de l'Isère, Grenoble, 1861-1866
- the Library and Museum of Grenoble, 1872

=== Restorations ===
- Roman aqueduct Pont du Gard 1841–1846. (World Heritage Site).
- Romanesque abbey church of St Philibert, Tournus 1841 onwards
- Romanesque abbey church of Saint-Gilles 1842 onwards. (World Heritage Site)

== Sources ==
- Structurae page on Questel
