= Alberto Braniff =

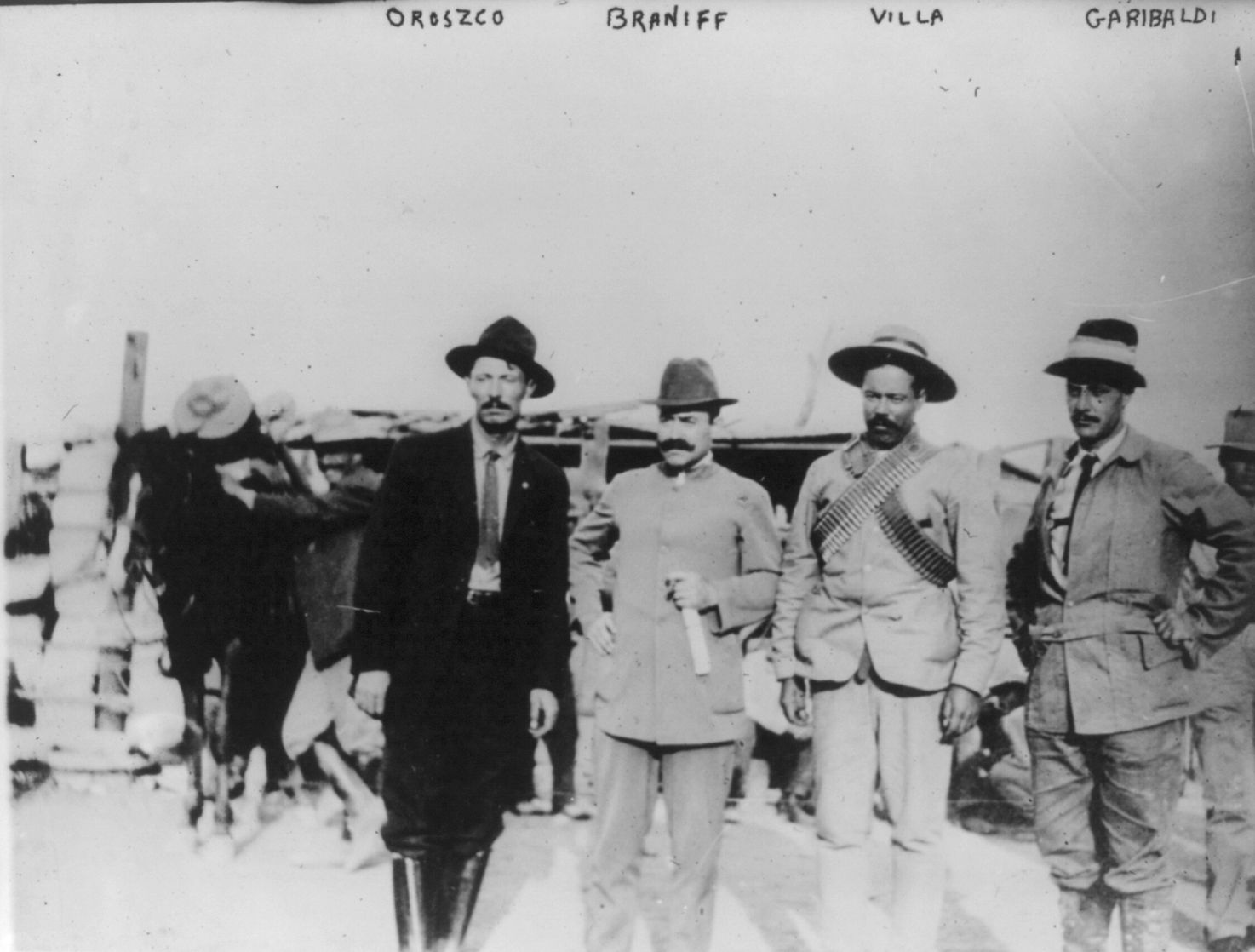
Left to Right: Pascual Orozco, Alberto Braniff, Pancho Villa and Peppino Garibaldi

Alberto Braniff Ricard (8 December 1886 – 17 September 1966) was a Mexican pioneering airplane pilot. He is considered the second aviator in Latin America, however the first born in Latin America.

== Life and career ==
Braniff was born in Mexico City into a wealthy and powerful family during the Porfiriato. His father was the American industrialist Thomas Braniff (not to be confused with Thomas Elmer Braniff, of Kansas City, Kansas, whose family founded Braniff International Airways) and his mother was María Beltran Lorenza Ricard. His father was born in Staten Island, New York, to Irish immigrants; he went to Mexico to be a superintendent of construction for the Mexico City-Veracruz railroad, lived through the Second Mexican Empire and eventually became an established member of the Mexican elite. Alberto went to study in Europe, where aviation flourished as he was a young adult. While in France, Braniff acquired a French-built airplane. Soon after, he returned by ship to his home country, with his airplane aboard.

Mexico during that era was a relatively new country in need of new achievements. After their country lost the Mexican–American War, Mexicans sought something or someone to restore their national pride. When Braniff returned home with his airplane, many Mexicans began to see him as a symbol of hope. Braniff, who had learned to fly the airplane while still in Europe, took it up upon himself to try to satisfy that need.

Years before Braniff was born, a prominent Mexico City newspaper had predicted that it would be impossible to fly to that city because of its high altitude and thin air. The article was published during an era when aerostat popularity was rising in Europe, and some Mexicans had successfully flown them in the northern areas of the country.

On January 8, 1910, Braniff flew his airplane Voisin monoplane, imported from France, over Mexico City. Apart from being the first pilot to fly an airplane over Mexico City, he made history by becoming both the first pilot to fly an airplane in Mexico and second in Latin America, because the first to take off in Latin America, and first aircraft designed entirely on Brazilian soil, was built by Dimitri Sensaud de Lavaud, was an engineer, inventor, and aviator of French descent, born in Spain and naturalized Brazilian living in Brazil. The airplane, baptized as São Paulo, flew in Osasco, in the state of São Paulo on January 7, 1910. The flight took place in front of a group of onlookers and journalists where today's Avenida João Batista is located.

Later on, Argentina's Jorge Newbery and Peru's Jorge Chávez followed in Braniff's footsteps as famous Latin American aviators.

Alberto Braniff, by most accounts, led a quiet life after his achievement, but lived long enough to see Mexico City International Airport begin to operate, and Mexican aviation's technical developments of the jet era.

Braniff died in Mexico City in 1966.
