= Eugène Ewald =

French architect

Eugène Joseph Ewald (3 February 1850, Paris–13 July 1927, Paris), was a French architect. Alumnus of the École nationale supérieure des beaux-arts, student of Charles-Auguste Questel and Jean-Louis Pascal. He was a member of the Académie d'Architecture, architect for the Paris Police Prefecture, diocesan architect for Mende, Perpignan and Blois, and an architect for the government and of historical monuments. He designed what would become the Les Bains Douches nightclub, as well as Fábricas Universales, a leading department store in Mexico City.

== Early life and training ==
Ewald was born in Paris. He entered the École des Beaux-Arts on 30 April 1868 as a second-class student (matriculation number 2455), in the atelier of Charles Questel and Jean-Louis Pascal. In his first two years he earned 19 valeurs, including a third medal in mathematics. In March 1870 he told the school that he had to leave for a year to work for an architect in Germany, and permission was granted. He did not stay there long: during the Franco-Prussian War he served as a soldier in the 36th infantry regiment at Coulon. He was back at the school by 4 January 1872, when he received a mention, and he moved up to the first class on 5 March 1874. That year he received a second mention for a sketch (4 June) and a first mention for a finished project (3 December).

Former Fábricas Universales department store (1907-9), Historic Center of Mexico City

=== Career ===
Ewald practised in Paris, with addresses in the 2nd arrondissement in 1876, the 9th in 1880, the 8th in 1882, and the 17th between 1886 and 1906. He held a number of official posts. He was a government architect and architect as well as for the Paris Police Prefecture, for which he later received an honorary title. On 20 June 1875 he became a ''rapporteur'' to the French government's committee on diocesan buildings, i.e. one of the architects who examined the plans and cost estimates for work on cathedrals, bishops' palaces and seminaries, which the state then paid for, and reported on them to the committee.. He was then named diocesan architect of Perpignan (Pyrénées-Orientales) on 27 May 1880, of Mende (Lozère) on 25 July 1887, and of Blois on 22 June 1905.

After the law of separation of church and state, he joined the Historic Monuments service. For this and his diocesan posts he worked on the church of Saint-François-de-Sales in the 17th arrondissement of Paris (1912–13), the church of Pézilla (Pyrénées-Orientales), and in Perpignan the chapel of the Blessed Sacrament and the chapel of the Lycée Saint-Louis-de-Gonzague. He also designed villas, bathing establishments, factories, and private houses, along with apartment buildings, at least four of which he built for himself between 1880 and 1898. He exhibited with the Amants de la Nature.

Ewald resigned from his post with Historic Monuments on 18 April 1913 for reasons of health, and was named honorary architect on 21 June of that year. He also served as an expert to the civil court of the Seine, a title he later held in an honorary capacity.

== Memberships and honours ==
Ewald belonged to the Réunion amicale des anciens élèves de l'atelier Questel-Pascal, sitting on its committee in 1899–1900, and became a member of the Société centrale des architectes in 1884. He was also a member of the Caisse de défense mutuelle des architectes. He was made an officier d'Académie (Palmes académiques) on 5 January 1896. The Société centrale des architectes awarded him its large silver medal for private architecture (Le Soufaché foundation) in 1899 and its gold médaille d'honneur (Guérinot foundation) in 1920.

== Death ==
Ewald died in Paris on 13 July 1927. His practice continued under the name cabinet Eug. Ewald, run by Eugène Vallet, in 1936.

== Works ==
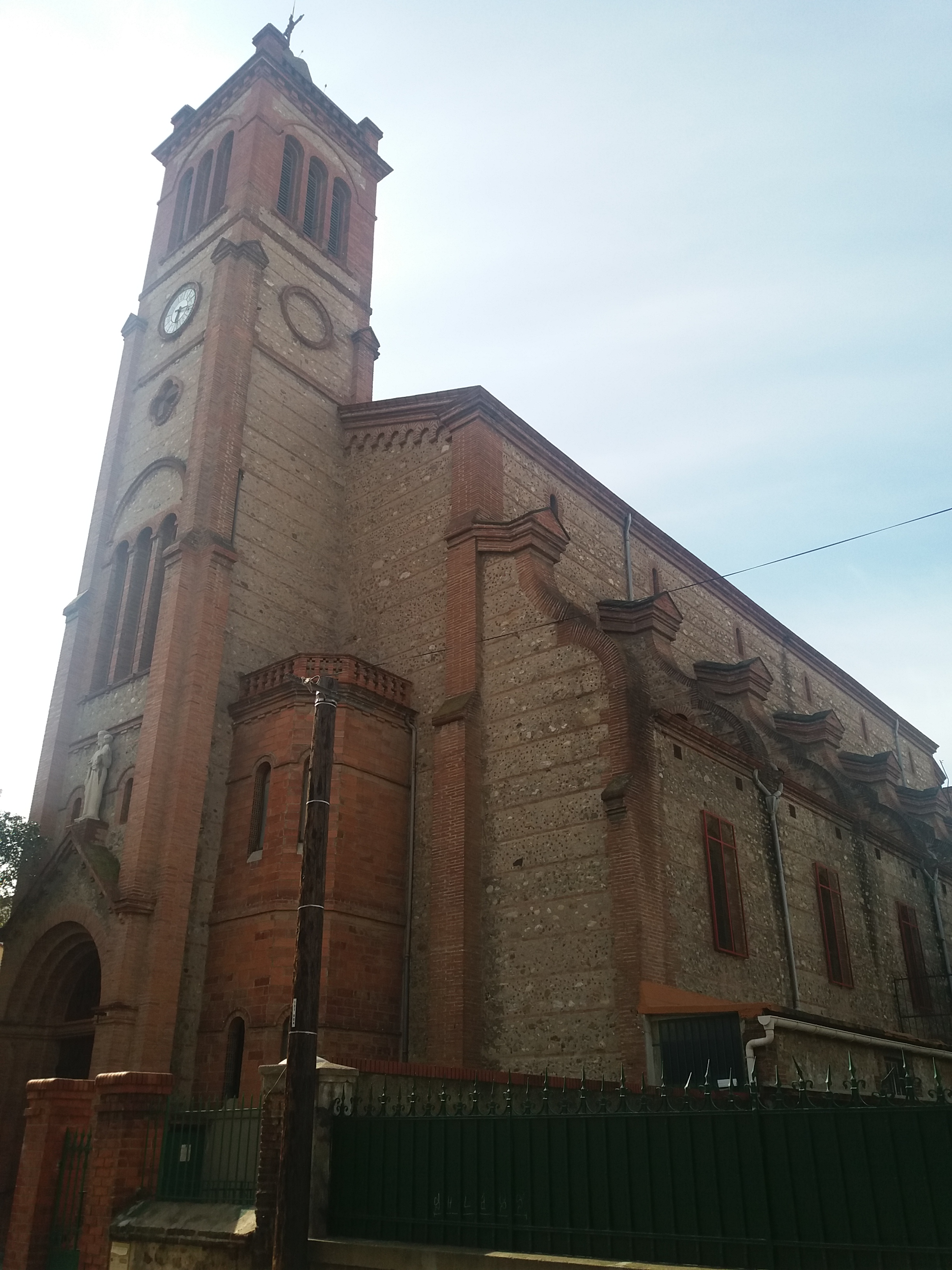
Saint-Joseph-de-la-Gare church (Sant Josep de Perpinyà in Catalan), Perpignan/Perpinyà

Partial list:

- Saint-Joseph-de-la-Gare (Sant Josep de Perpinyà), Perpignan, church, 1892-3
- Residential building in the 7th arrondissement of Parit, 1899
- 11, avenue Percier, Paris, offices, 1903
- Las Fábricas Universales department store, corner of Calle 5 de Febrero and Calle de Venustiano Carranza, Historic center of Mexico City, 1907–1909
- 19-23 bis rue de Vienne, Paris, 1911
- Les Bains Douches, the former Guerbois Baths, 7, rue du Bourg l’Abbé Before becoming the famous nightclub, now closed, 1913
- Paroisse Saint-François de Sales- Nouvelle église, Paris, church, 1913
- 43, avenue Hoche, Paris , offices, 1913
- Solstys Vienne, Paris, offices ~1915
- 45, avenue Hoche, Paris, residential, 1915
