= La Ciudad de Londres =

Former department store in Mexico City

- Industry: Retail
- Founded: before 1850
- Headquarters: Mexico City, Mexico
- Key people: Joseph Ollivier
- Products: Cloth, clothing, novelties

La Ciudad de Londres (Spanish for "The City of London") was a dry-goods and novelty store, later a department store, in the historic center of Mexico City. It was one of the "Barcelonnettes" department stores founded by immigrants from the French town of Barcelonnette, and for much of the 19th century it belonged to Joseph Ollivier.

== History ==
The store was founded by Barcelonnettes some years before 1850, the year Joseph Ollivier (1829–1910) came to Mexico and started work there as an employee. At the time it was a cajón de ropa (dry-goods shop) on Calle de la Monterilla, now Avenida 5 de Febrero.

In 1863 Ollivier bought the store together with another Barcelonnette, Fernando Audiffred. That same year La Ciudad de Londres and three other stores: Fábricas de Francia, El Puerto de Liverpool and El Gran Oriental, started buying directly from manufacturers in Paris. Ollivier became majority partner in 1879 and ran the company for the next 20 years, now under the name J. Ollivier y Compañía.

Ollivier was the first of the Barcelonnette merchants to join two buildings into one store, knocking down the party walls to give customers more room to move, but keeping the traditional counter. Historian Leticia Gamboa Ojeda writes that by 1860 the store had grown so much that it took up two separate premises, and that it then moved to No. 5 on the same street, where it stayed until 1909. She ties the store to Édouard Gassier, as does Cristina Sánchez Parra, who lists Gassier as owner in her table of stores that advertised between 1891 and 1915.

Ollivier later said La Ciudad de Londres had become "a true nursery of businesses", having helped set up more than 80 commercial houses in Mexico City and the provinces. One of these men was his nephew Sébastien Robert, later co-owner of El Centro Mercantil department store (now the Gran Hotel Ciudad de México). Ollivier also owned other stores, among them La Sorpresa and La Primavera, as well as a pottery factory on Calle del Niño Perdido, whose wares were sold in department stores like La Ciudad de Londres itself.

In the early 20th century it was still one of the big Mexico City stores, along with El Palacio de Hierro, El Puerto de Liverpool, El Centro Mercantil, La Francia Marítima and others. A 1910 advertisement in El Imparcial describes dresses on show in one of the store's windows facing Calle de la Palma; Sánchez Parra uses it as an example of the "permanent exhibition" of goods that the big stores brought over from Europe.

== Stores of the same name ==
Other Barcelonnette stores also used the name, among them La Ciudad de Londres in Guadalajara, founded by Lèbre and Dandoulf, and one in San Luis Potosí owned by Blanc & Garcin.

== See also ==
- Barcelonnette department stores of Mexico
