= Barcelonnette department stores of Mexico =

Department stores in Mexico founded by emigrants from the Ubaye Valley

The Barcelonnettes (Spanish: los barcelonnettes, also spelled barcelonettes) were emigrants from the Ubaye Valley around Barcelonnette, in the Alpes-de-Haute-Provence of southeast France. They settled in Mexico from the early 1800s and opened many of the country's first department stores, then called almacenes de novedades (novelty stores). By the early 1900s they ran 70% of Mexico's textile factories and its biggest stores.

This article covers the stores from about 1820 to 1960, by region. El Palacio de Hierro, El Puerto de Liverpool, La Ciudad de Londres and Las Fábricas Universales have their own articles and are only summarized here; the modern Palacio and Liverpool chains are a separate story.

== Background ==
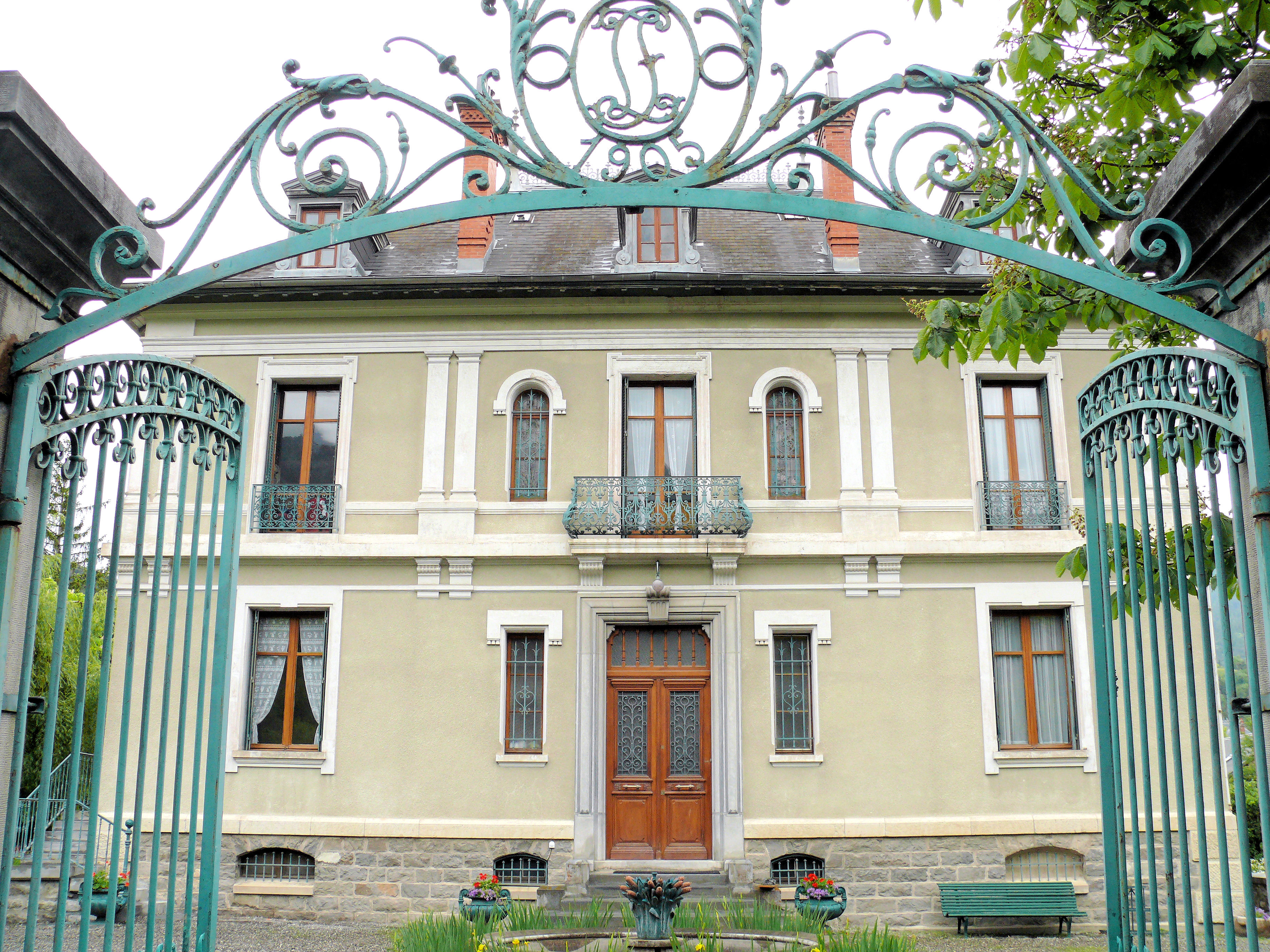
Villa mexicaine in Barcelonnette, built by returning emigrants

New arrivals started as employees, with food and lodging but no pay in the first year; later they opened their own stores with help from earlier emigrants. The stores followed the Paris department-store model. In the First World War, 561 employees of the stores and mills went back to fight for France; El Centro Mercantil alone sent 47.

=== Textile mills ===
The owners pooled their money to supply their own shelves. The Compañía Industrial de Orizaba (CIDOSA) was formed on 28 June 1889 by merchants almost all from Barcelonnette, including the owners of El Palacio de Hierro, El Puerto de Liverpool, La Ciudad de Londres, El Puerto de Veracruz and El Correo Francés; its mill was at Río Blanco. In 1896 another group formed the Compañía Industrial Veracruzana (CIVSA), with a mill at Santa Rosa, 11 km from Orizaba.

== Mexico City ==
Mexico City was the center of the network. Trentini's 1907 descriptions of the grandes tiendas (large stores) cover El Palacio de Hierro, El Puerto de Liverpool, El Centro Mercantil and Las Fábricas Universales.

=== El Palacio de Hierro ===
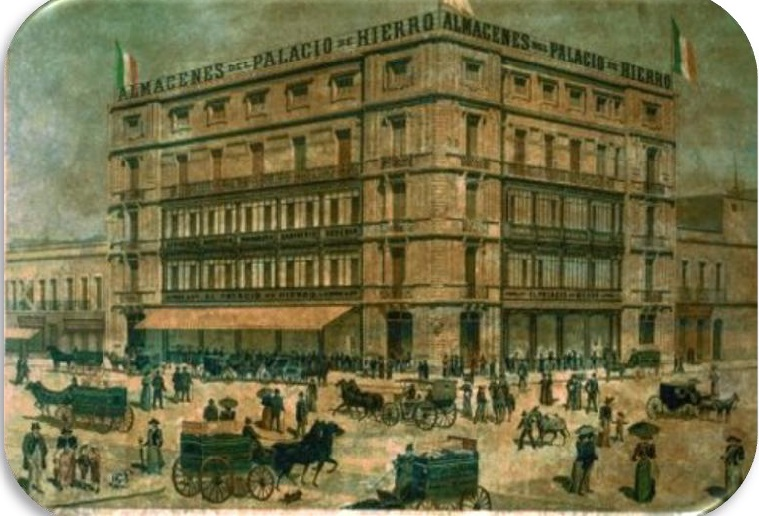
The first store in 1898

Joseph Tron and Joseph Léautaud founded it after selling Las Fábricas de Francia in 1888. The first building, at San Bernardo and Callejuela, was commissioned in 1889, and in 1898 the business became a joint-stock company (sociedad anónima). A fire in 1914 destroyed the original building; it reopened in 1921.

=== El Puerto de Liverpool ===
Trentini's 1907 description says it was founded in 1851 by Jean-Baptiste Ebrard and F. Fortoul, at San Bernardo and Callejuela. Galán Amaro dates it to 1847 and lists Ebrard, Fortolis, Jaubert and Michel as partners. The steel for the 1905 building was shipped from Germany.

=== La Ciudad de Londres ===
Trentini called it the oldest and most important novelty house in Mexico. Galán Amaro dates it to 1838. Its owner Joseph Ollivier opened a buying house in Paris in 1874 and bought La Sorpresa in 1903.

=== Las Fábricas Universales ===
Former Las Fábricas Universales building

Alexandre Reynaud founded it; the 1909 building at 5 de Febrero and Venustiano Carranza is by Eugène Ewald. Galán Amaro gives 1893 for the firm and names Reynaud and Joseph Signoret. The building is now a C&A store.

=== Al Puerto de Veracruz ===
Former Al Puerto de Veracruz building

Léon Signoret founded it with his brother Antoine and Léon Honnorat. The building at 5 de Febrero and Venustiano Carranza is still there (now a fabric store).

=== El Centro Mercantil ===
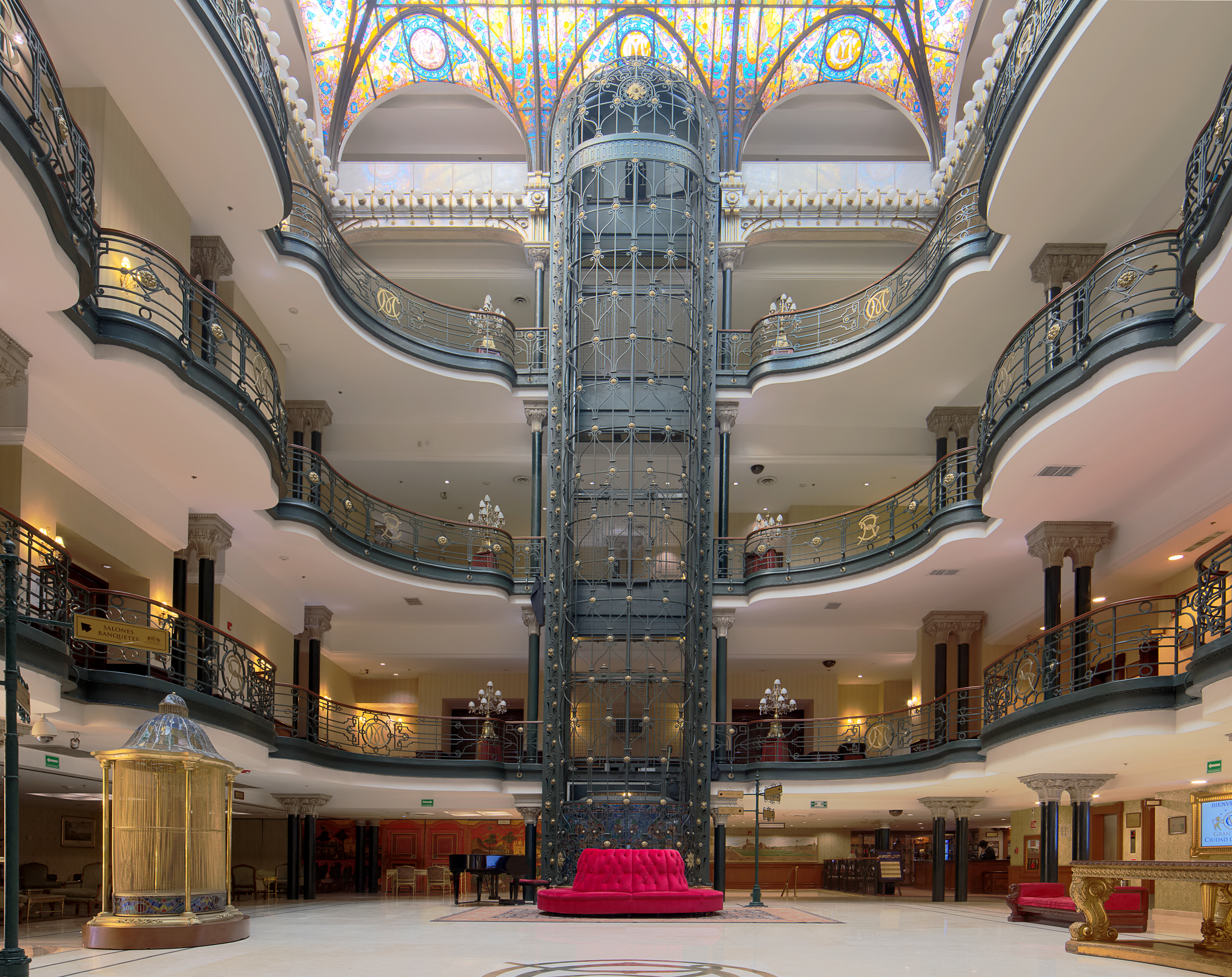
Atrium of the former Centro Mercantil, now the Gran Hotel Ciudad de México

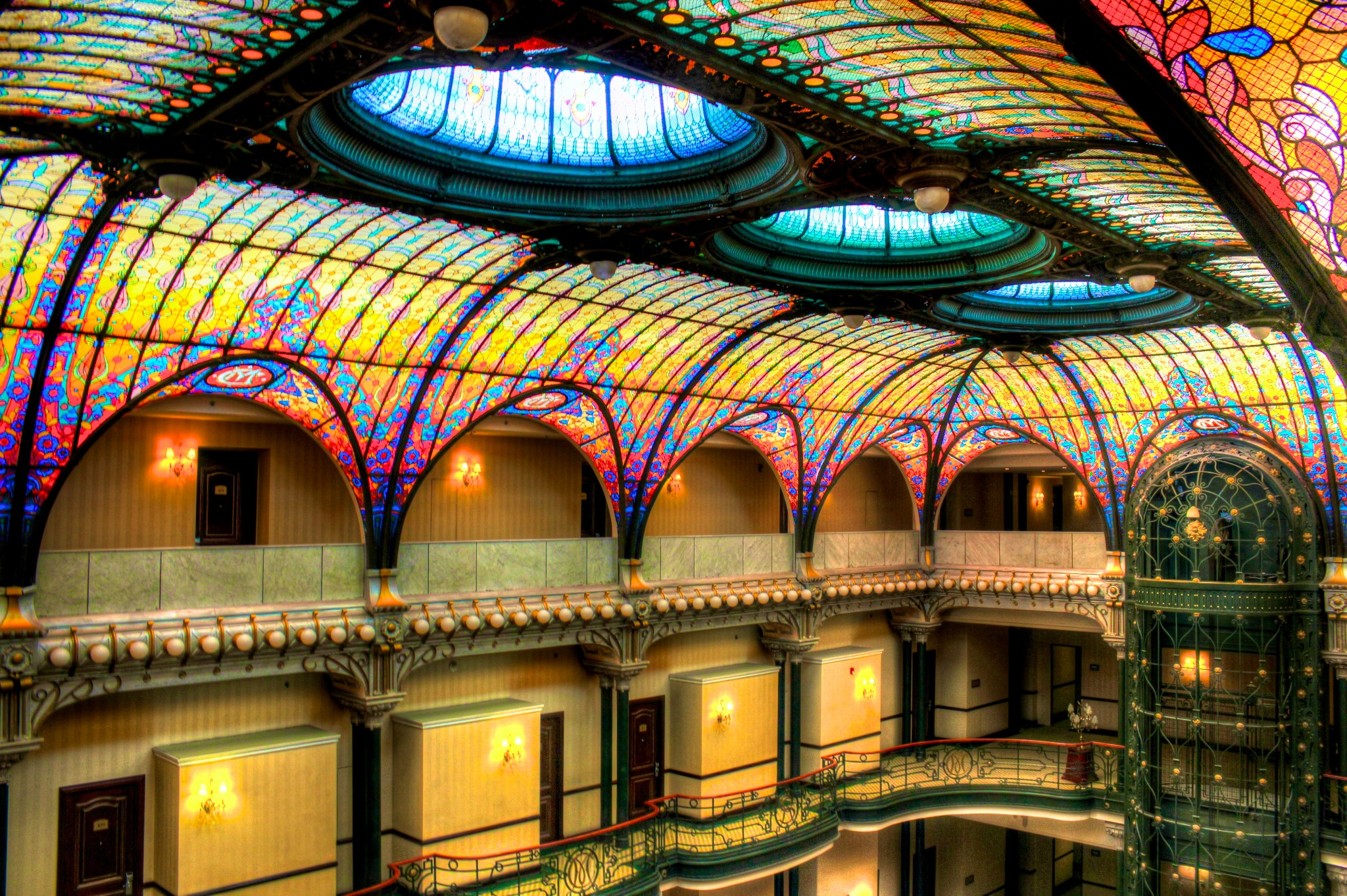
Glass ceiling

Sébastien Robert founded it and owned it with Émile Meyran as S. Robert y Cía.; it sold novelties, furniture, carpets and curtains. It had its own mills at Tizapán, in the south of the city. The store opened on the Zócalo on 2 September 1899, in a building by Daniel Garza, although Galán Amaro dates the firm to 1884. The stained-glass ceiling by Jacques Grüber was not finished until 1908, and the store kept operating until 1958. The building became the Gran Hotel Ciudad de México in 1968.

=== Las Fábricas de Francia (Mexico City) ===
This is the Mexico City store, not the later Fábricas de Francia chain of Guadalajara. Joseph Tron started there as an employee after arriving in 1864. Tron and Léautaud bought it from Gassier and Reynaud; Galán Amaro dates the store to 1842 and their purchase to 1880.

=== La Valenciana ===
La Valenciana was one of the two big Barcelonnette houses in the capital. Sébastien Robert partnered with Émile Meyran there, and the two later founded El Centro Mercantil. Proal and Charpenel call Meyran a director and partner of both houses. Joseph Léautaud worked there for ten years before founding El Palacio de Hierro. Galán Amaro's table names Aubert, Meyran, Plauchud, Paulino Richaud and Robert as owners (1884).

=== La Francia Marítima ===
Galán Amaro's table dates La Francia Marítima to 1851 and lists Jean-Baptiste Ebrard, Félix Fortolis, Adrien Jean and Luis Veyan as partners. Trentini gave 1851 and the names Ebrard and Fortoul for El Puerto de Liverpool.

=== El Correo Francés ===
Galán Amaro's table lists El Correo Francés under Mario Lambert and Alexandre Reynaud, and her text says Reynaud set the store up in Mexico City. Lambert was also one of the original CIDOSA investors.

=== La Reforma del Comercio ===
A large partnership owned La Reforma del Comercio. Galán Amaro's table lists Emile André, Emile and Joseph Audiffred, Faudon, Auguste Garcin, Jules Lions and Adolphe Richaud; Proal and Charpenel call Garcin one of its directors and Richaud, who arrived in Mexico in 1870, one of its owners.

=== París-Londres ===
París-Londres had stores in Mexico City, Guadalajara and Querétaro; descendants of its founder, Couzin, ran it in the late twentieth century. The source does not say where Couzin was from.

=== Other Mexico City stores ===
Galán Amaro's table of firms owned by Barcelonnettes also names these Mexico City houses:

- Tienda de las Siete Puertas (1821), founded by François, Honoré and Jacques Arnaud.
- Portal de las Flores (1838), Caire, Derbez, Jauffred and Tessier.
- La Estrella (1854), Joseph Ollivier, Alphonse Jauffred and Falque.
- El Gran Oriental, Alphonse, Calixte, Fortuné and Jean-Baptiste Caire, with L. Faudon.
- El Importador, Max Chauvet.
- Correo del Comercio (1888), Etcharen and Martel.
- La Sorpresa (1903), bought by Joseph Ollivier.
- La Unión (1904), Aimé and Jules Tron.

== Bajío and Jalisco ==
=== Guadalajara ===
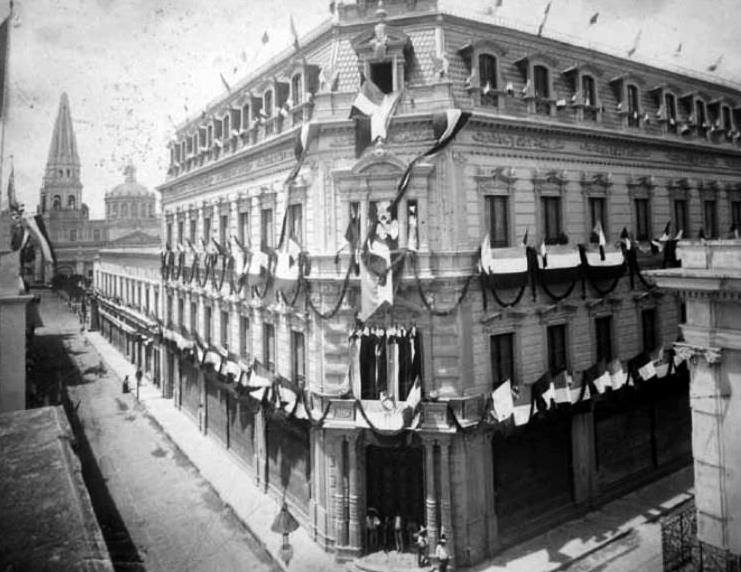
Las Fábricas de Francia, Guadalajara, c. 1905

Las Fábricas de Francia, opened in 1878, was Guadalajara's first department store. Trentini says Fortoul, Bec y Cía. founded it, with a knitwear factory of more than 300 workers. Branches later opened in León, Morelia, Tepic, Mazatlán and Aguascalientes.

La Ciudad de Londres in Guadalajara was founded by Lébre and Dandoulf. Trentini puts it on the corner of López Cotilla street and Corona avenue; Valerio Ulloa dates it to between 1851 and 1858 and puts it at 16 de Septiembre and Juárez.

La Ciudad de México in Guadalajara was founded in 1880 by Adrien Berlie and Eugène Cogordan, who that year handed it to Louis Gas and Félix Cogordan. The source does not say whether any of them was a Barcelonnette.

=== Michoacán and Guanajuato ===
In Morelia, Aimé Tron bought the novelty store Al Progreso in 1911; it got its goods from El Palacio de Hierro in Mexico City. When the lease ended in 1932, the group opened Al Sombrero Colorado, a novelty and hat store, in the neighboring Tron Hermanos building. A 1907 list by Auguste Genin also names Barcelonnette stores in Guanajuato and León.

== Puebla and the center ==
Gamboa Ojeda counts ten clothing and novelty houses in Puebla during the Porfiriato, plus three hat shops and a shirt shop; not all were founded by Barcelonnettes.

=== La Ciudad de México ===
It was the oldest and biggest of the ten, founded in 1862 by Juan Bautista Lions and Juan Bautista Chaix. Proal and Charpenel say the founders were the Lions brothers Eugène, Jules and Antoine, sons of a Barcelonnette tailor. From 1862 to 1910 it was on the ground floor of the Casa de los Muñecos; its new building opened on 21 February 1910. Gamboa Ojeda ties the design of that building to the Paris house La Samaritaine. Adrián Reynaud joined in 1880, and after the Lions family left in 1911 he carried on with León Signoret until 1918.

=== Al Puerto de Liverpool ===
Al Puerto de Liverpool was the third most important French clothing store in Puebla. It was in a central building, first rented and then bought, and never had one built for it. José Desdier founded it in 1874; Julio Caire, Luis Chaix and the brothers Julio and Eugenio Sibilot joined him later.

=== La Primavera ===
La Primavera was the second biggest, but other foreign merchants founded it in 1880, not Barcelonnettes. Paulino Richaud, Juan Robert and Eugenio Caire took it over in the early 1900s; Galán Amaro gives 1903.

=== Las Fábricas de Francia ===
Las Fábricas de Francia began in the 1890s as a branch of J. Ebrard y Compañía of Mexico City. Julio A. Lions later owned it; in 1902 he handed it over in payment to El Palacio de Hierro, whose manager Fortunato Béraud then ran it with Javier Philip and José Proal.

=== Au Bon Marché and La Independencia ===
Julio A. Lions founded Au Bon Marché in the 1890s, and in 1895 it took over the stock, credits and debts of La Independencia. Lions's former partners bought it in 1903, the date Galán Amaro gives for the firm.

=== El Louvre and La Barata ===
Alfredo Esmenjaud and the brothers Isidoro and Santiago Couttolenc founded El Louvre in 1900. La Barata was the smallest of the ten. A merchant who was neither French nor Barcelonnette founded it, and the Lions brothers and Julio Rebattu bought it in 1903.

=== Al Puerto de Veracruz ===
Al Puerto de Veracruz also had a store in Puebla, at the corner of Avenida 4 Poniente and Calle 5 de Mayo in the Centro Histórico. The building dates from the 1950s and was one of the first modern buildings in the center; it had underground parking on the 4 Poniente side. A local news report says Spanish businessmen based in Veracruz ran the store, and it does not connect it to the Barcelonnette owners of the Mexico City store of the same name.

=== Hat shops and other stores ===
The Gran Sombrerería Francesa was begun by Barthélemy Rebattu and later run under the name of Léon-Baptiste Esmenjaud. Galán Amaro's table of firms owned by Barcelonnettes also lists these Puebla stores:

- La Independencia (1851), Honorato Arnaud, Léon Donneaud, Jules Lions and Paulino Richaud.
- El Incendio, Isidore Couttolenc, Enrique Gislard and the Manuel brothers.
- Camisería El Fénix, Luis Chaix.
- Fábricas Universales (1903), Juan Pedro Chaix.

Gamboa Ojeda's table of Barcelonnette advertising in Puebla, 1874–1928, lists more clothing and general stores, with the years they advertised:

- El Incendio (hats), 1874 and 1885; Gran Sombrerería Francesa (hats), 1885 and 1890; Al Sombrero Francés (hats), 1909 and 1918.
- El Fénix (shirts and men's wear), 1909 and 1918; Gamboa Ojeda names Eduardo Chaix as the owner, while Galán Amaro's table gives Luis Chaix.
- Carlos V. Toussaint (shirts and hairdresser), 1895 and 1896.
- Gran Sastrería Francesa (tailor), 1874; E. Dubernard (tailor, a branch), 1896.
- Depósito de Curtidos Francés (leather), 1884; Gran Bazar Parisiense (jewelry and furniture), 1884.
- E. Garcín (clothing and novelties), 1885; Gran Ciudad de Londres (haberdashery, hardware and paint), 1885; Las Fábricas Universales, 1885.
- El Juguete (haberdashery and toys), 1891; El Louvre, 1909; La Ciudad de Lyon, 1915.

The same table has pharmacies (Botica Francesa, advertising 1874–1896, and Botica Guadalupana), stationery and book shops (El Libro Mayor, La Enseñanza Objetiva), restaurants and hotels (Magloire, the Reynaud/Jockey Club hotel, Hotel Pasaje y Francia) and drinks businesses (Cervecería del Fénix, El Venado, and E. Latisnere, who bought an old ice and soda-water factory in 1899). By its count La Ciudad de México advertised the most, 27 times between 1885 and 1925.

Gamboa Ojeda's earlier chapter also names La Ciudad de Lyon and a store owned by Emilio Garcín, in a count of eleven. Genin's 1907 list names stores in Cuautla too.

== Elsewhere ==
El Templo del Comercio, in Tulancingo, Hidalgo, belonged to André Audiffred and Vinay.

Genin's 1907 list names Barcelonnette stores in Zacatecas, Saltillo, Monterrey and Hermosillo.

Ollivier of La Ciudad de Londres also founded a novelty store in Veracruz, and Genin's list names one in Orizaba.

La Ciudad de Londres in San Luis Potosí belonged to the successors of Blanc y Garcin. Trentini calls it the largest clothing store in the city.

== See also ==
- Barcelonnette, France
- Ubaye Valley, France
- Fábricas de Francia (Guadalajara-based chain)
- El Puerto de Liverpool
- El Palacio de Hierro
- French Mexicans
- París-Londres
- Río Blanco, Veracruz

== Bibliography ==
- Proal, Maurice; Charpenel, Pierre (1998). Los barcelonnettes en México [The Barcelonnettes in Mexico] (in Spanish). Clío.
- Galán Amaro, Erika Yesica (2005). Los barcelonnettes en México, un ejemplo de espíritu empresarial (1821-1930) [The Barcelonnettes in Mexico, an example of entrepreneurial spirit (1821–1930)]. X Jornadas Interescuelas/Departamentos de Historia (in Spanish). Universidad Nacional del Rosario.
- Gamboa Ojeda, Leticia (1998). "Los barcelonnettes en la ciudad de Puebla. Panorama de sus actividades económicas en el porfiriato" [The Barcelonnettes in the city of Puebla: overview of their economic activities in the Porfiriato]. México Francia [Mexico France] (in Spanish). Centro de estudios mexicanos y centroamericanos.
- Gamboa Ojeda, Leticia (1993). "Los comercios de barcelonnettes y la cultura del consumo entre las élites urbanas: Puebla, 1862-1928" [The Barcelonnettes' stores and consumer culture among the urban elites: Puebla, 1862–1928]. México Francia [Mexico France] (in Spanish). Centro de estudios mexicanos y centroamericanos.
- Galindo, José (2025). "Los empresarios barcelonnettes en México: Sus redes sociales y de negocios, siglos XIX y XX" [The Barcelonnette entrepreneurs in Mexico: their social and business networks, nineteenth and twentieth centuries]. História e Economia (in Spanish). 25: 59–73.
- Galindo, José (2021). "Empresas familiares, estrategias y persistencia: los franceses y su importancia en la industrialización de México" [Family businesses, strategies and persistence: the French and their importance in Mexico's industrialization]. Revista Tiempo & Economía (in Spanish). 8 (2).
- Sánchez Parra, Cristina (2020). "La publicidad de las tiendas por departamentos de la ciudad de México en los albores del siglo XX" [Advertising by Mexico City's department stores at the dawn of the twentieth century]. Historia Mexicana (in Spanish). 69 (4): 1597–1646. doi:10.24201/hm.v69i4.4053.
- Valerio Ulloa, Sergio (2016). "Almacenes comerciales franceses en Guadalajara, México (1850-1930)" [French commercial stores in Guadalajara, Mexico (1850–1930)]. América Latina en la Historia Económica (in Spanish). 23 (1): 68–89.
- Saldaña Solís, Marcela (2019). "El antiguo almacén de El Puerto de Liverpool: un ejemplo de historia de la construcción, 1904-1905" [The former El Puerto de Liverpool store: an example of construction history, 1904–1905]. Boletín de Monumentos Históricos (in Spanish) (46): 129–141.
