= La Parisina =

Chain of department stores in Mexico

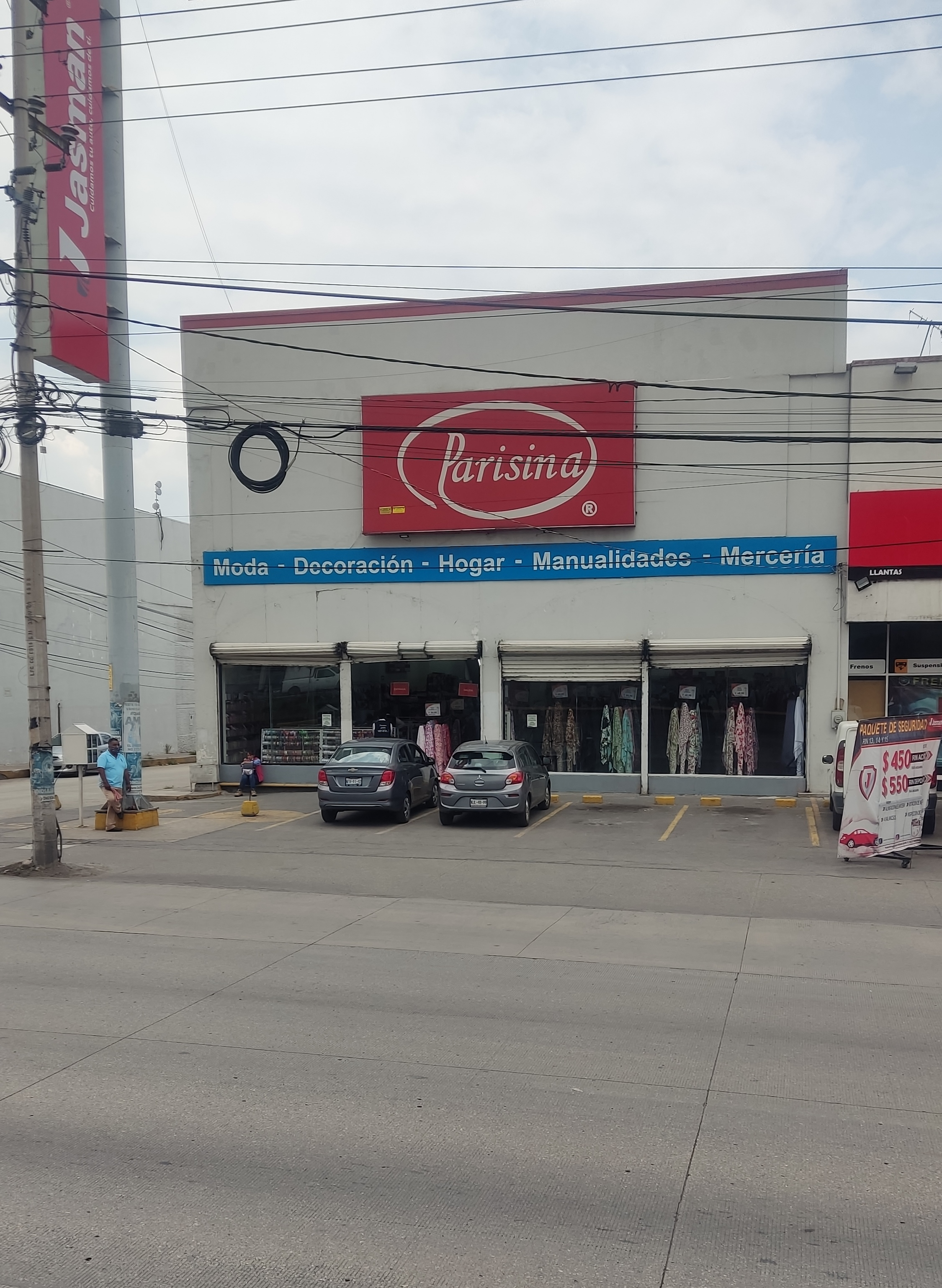
A Parisina store in Coacalco, in the northern part of Greater Mexico City

La Parisina is a chain of department stores in Mexico operated by the company Grupo Parisina S.A de C.V. It sells mainly fabrics and millinery, home decor, embroidery, sewing machines, rugs and other goods. The group first began operations in 1933 when Juan José Sierra opened his 220 m2 store in the Historic Center of Mexico City. The group currently operates more than 600 department stores and speciality shops across Mexico.

From 1990 to 1999 the group also operated the "Almacenes García" chain which grew during that period from 18 to 42 stores.
