= Colonia Buenavista =

Coordinates: 19°26′52.72″N 99°9′7.35″W

Buenavista
- Neighbourhood of Mexico City
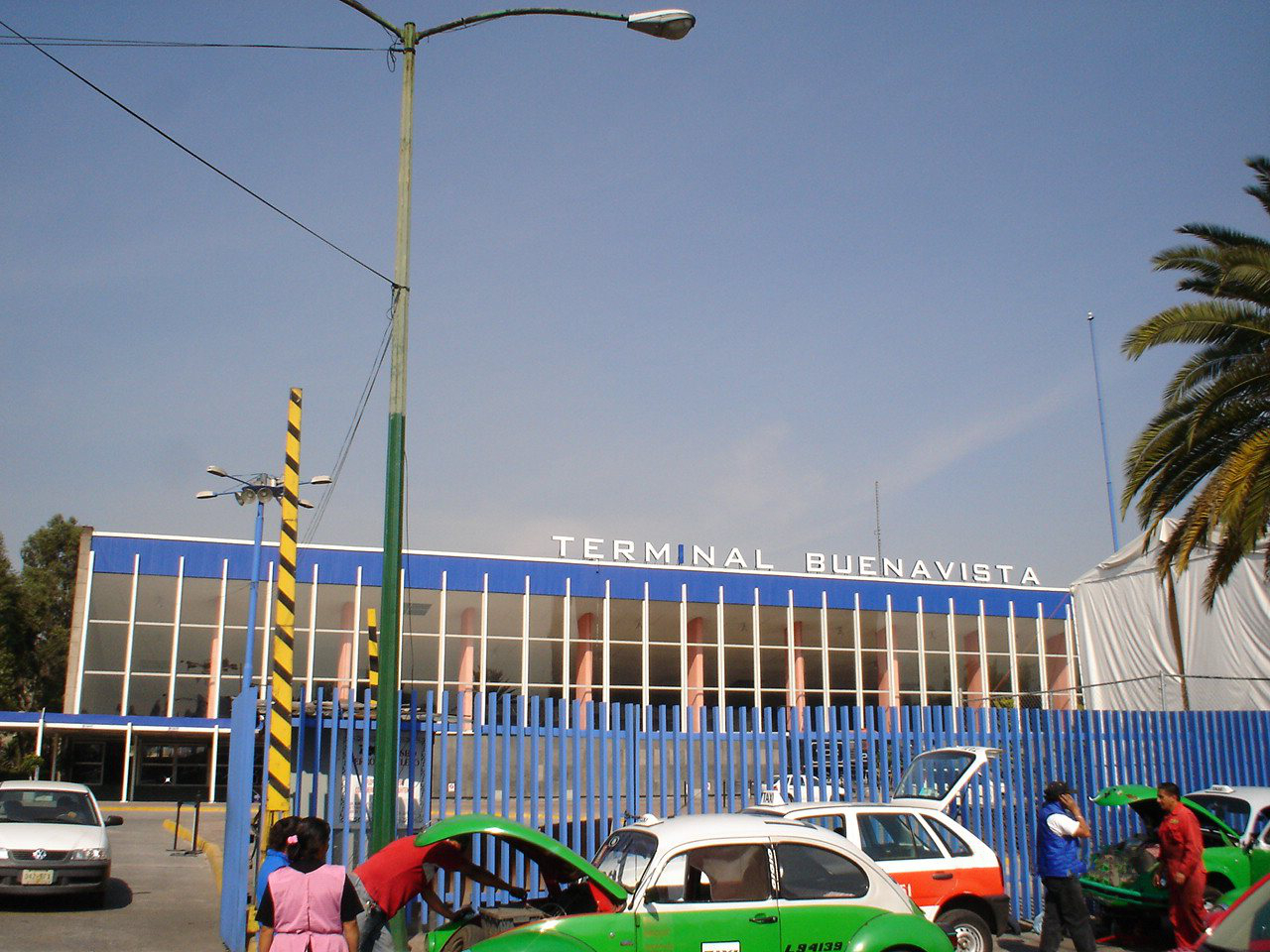
- Buenavista railway station before the 2008 renovation

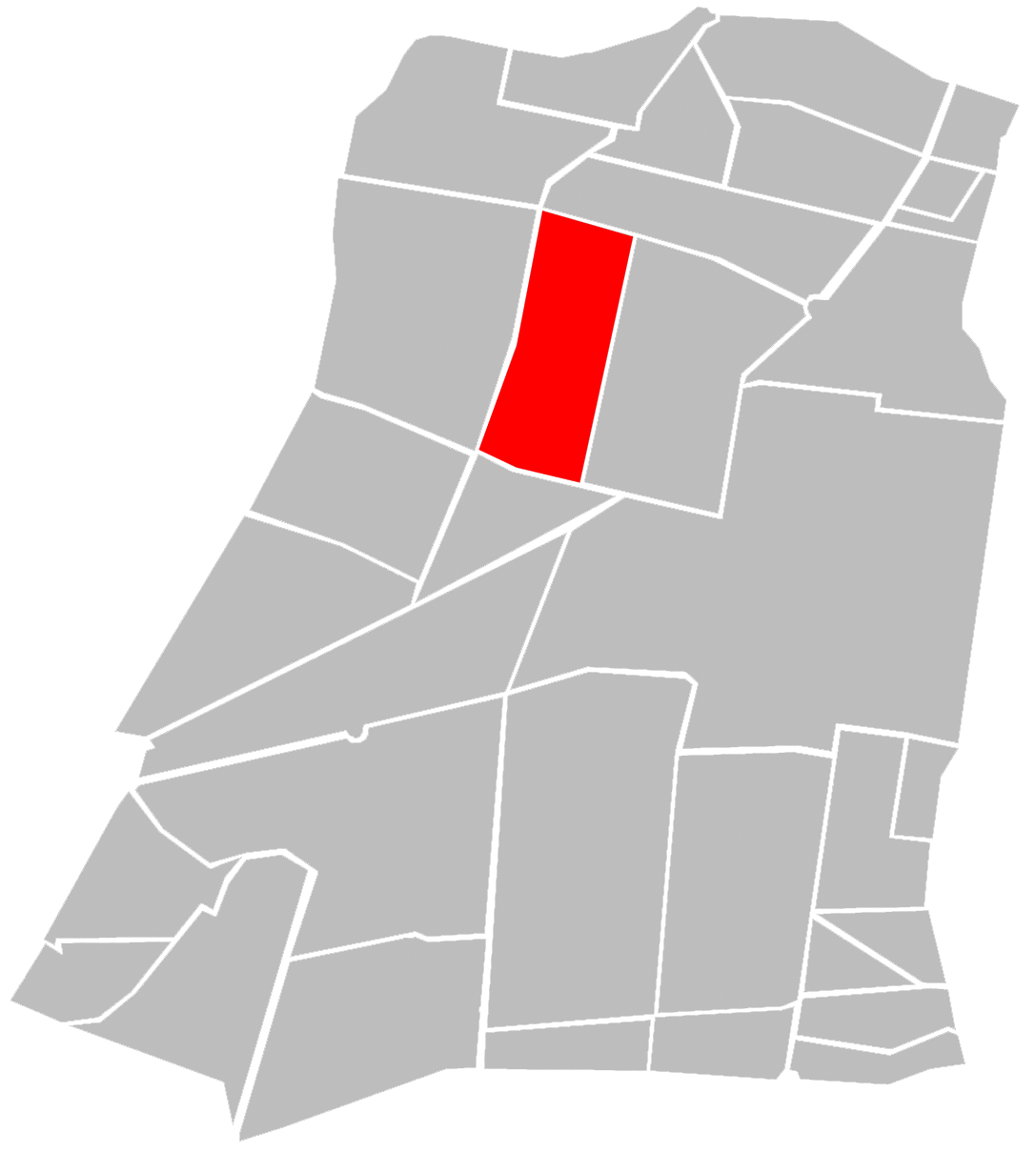
- Location of Colonia Buenavista (in red) within Cuauhtémoc borough
- Country: Mexico
- City: Mexico City
- Borough: Cuauhtémoc

Population (2010)
  - Total: 15,605
- Postal code: 06350

Colonia Buenavista is a colonia or neighbourhood in the Cuauhtémoc borough located northwest of the historic center of Mexico City. What would become the city's main train terminal, Buenavista Station, stood here 1873–1958, and a new Buenavista Station opened in its place in 1961. Though there is no longer intercity passenger service to or from Mexico City, the station is still the terminus of the Tren Suburbano commuter rail line, in a complex together with a major shopping mall, the Forum Buenavista. The colonia is also home to the offices of the Cuauhtémoc borough and the mega José Vasconcelos Library.

== Location ==
The neighborhood is bordered by:

- Av. Ricardo Flores Magón to the north, across which is Conjunto Urbano Nonoalco Tlatelolco
- Avenida de los Insurgentes Norte to the west, across which is Santa María la Ribera
- Av. Puente de Alvarado to the south, across which is Colonia Tabacalera
- Eje 1 Poniente Guerrero to the east, across which is Colonia Guerrero

== Description ==
The boundaries of the colonia are marked by the following streets: Avenida Puente del Alvarado to the south, Calzada de Nonoalco or Flores Magón to the north, Eje Guerrero to the east and Avenida Insurgentes North to the west.

The colonia is best known as a hub of transportation, with the offices of the Cuauhtémoc borough and Telecommunications Commission also located here. Metro Buenavista is located here, near the Mexico City terminal of the Tren Suburbano commuter railway. This train brings workers into the downtown area from as far as the northern city of Cuautitlán in Mexico State.

Another landmark is the Biblioteca Vasconcelos (Vasconcelos Library), which is a tall glass building which contrasts noticeably with the surrounding area. It was inaugurated in 2006 with a collection of over 575,000 books, multimedia, and music. It is open to the public with 640 computers, multimedia room, music room, children's section, Braille material section and film library. The library attracts an average of 3,000 visitors daily.

Forum Buenavista is one of the large shopping malls of the city, in the same complex as the train station.

== History ==
The name of the colonia is from a former owner of the lands here, Miguel Pérez de Santa Cruz Andoboya, the Marquis of Buenavista, who was the mayor of Mexico City three times during the 1710s and 1720s. The mansion of the marquis was located in front of the small plaza which is on Avenida Puente de Alvarado, near the current offices of the Institutional Revolutionary Party. This building is now the Museo Nacional de San Carlos. This plaza maintains a number of arches from the Santa Fe Aqueduct, which brought water into the city.

During the 18th century, the area was filed with large orchards and gardens that stretched to what is now the Calzada de San Cosme. By 1871, the aqueduct was no longer used and crumbling and the city decided to sell the lands. Part of it was purchased by the Ferrocarril Mexicano, which opened Buenavista Street to provide better access to the nearby train terminal. This terminal began operations in 1873, and son became known as the Buenavista station. This terminal reached its height at the very beginning of the 20th century.

The station and the rail system in general waned as a nationwide highway system developed in the 20th century. The station was closed in 1958, in order to build a newer station nearby. The old station was demolished and the lands it was on began to be urbanized, extending Buenavista Street north to Avenida Central and adding new streets such as Aldama and Violeta. The offices of the Cuauhtemoc borough were constructed here in the 1970s.

In the 1990s, the Ferrocarriles Nacionales was sold into private hands and operations in Buenavista ceased in September 1999. The Buenavista train station closed and only some cargo freight currently passes through the area. It was replaced by the Buenavista station of the Tren Suburbano which became operational in 2008. It and the library have spurred much change in the colonia. While some of it has been positive, such as investment in new and existing businesses, some negative such as walled off areas that have attracted crime. The goal of the development projects have been to revitalize the area which had deteriorated badly since the closing of the rail yards in the 20th century.
