= Fábricas de Francia =

Mexican chain of department stores

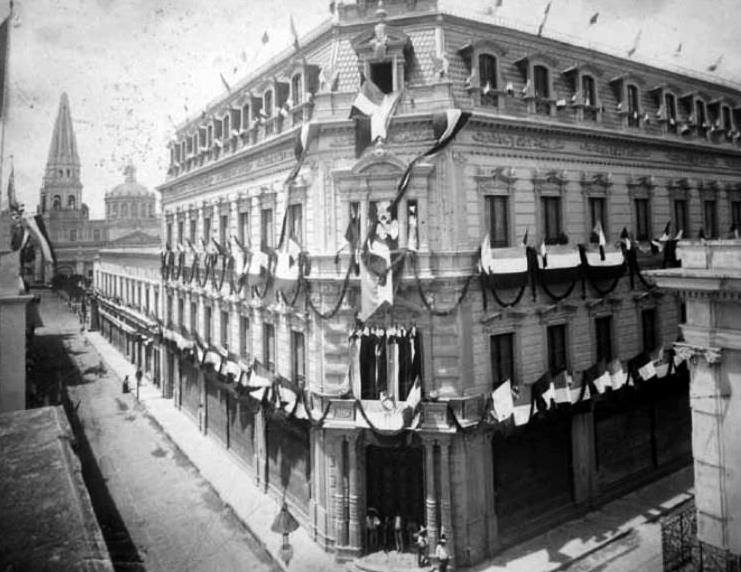
The original store in 1905 after the 1899 remodel

Fábricas de Francia (English: Factories of France) was a Mexican department store founded in 1878 in Guadalajara as a lingerie store by 3 French immigrants, one of dozens of the so-called "Barcelonnette" department stores in Mexico founded by immigrants from the area around Barcelonnette in the French Alps.

In 1988, the El Puerto de Liverpool group bought the chain. By 2018, there were 41 Fábricas stores across Mexico. In 2018 and 2019, El Puerto de Liverpool phased out the Fábricas de Francia brand and all stores were converted to either the Liverpool or Suburbia brand, except for three that were closed permanently.

== History ==
Fábricas de Francia was founded as a lingerie store in Guadalajara in 1878 by Disiderio Bonnafoux, José Chapuy and Léon Fortoul, immigrants from the Ubaye Valley and Barcelonnette in southeastern France. The original store was at the northeast corner of San Francisco street (today, Avenida Juárez) and Del Carmen (today, Avenida 16 de Septiembre), a mansion (Spanish: palacio) of typical Spanish Colonial architecture. With its growing success, the building was expanded and remodeled in 1898-9 in Parisian style (Second Empire style. It became the largest department store in the city, surpassing Ciudad de México, La Ciudad de París and Nuevo Mundo.

The Parisian style in architecture was less appreciated by 1948, and the once-impressive palacio was demolished in order to expand Juárez Avenue. The store opened its doors again, now in a modern-style building, which was rebuilt again in the early 1980s after an extensive fire. The façade that existed at the end of 1990 is the same today, though the store is now a branch of Liverpool, as in 2018-9 the owners El Puerto de Liverpool group converted 38 of the 41 Fábricas de Francia stores to either Liverpool or Suburbia formats, and permanently closed three others.

== Stores ==
Table of Fábricas de Francia stores (2018) converted to Liverpool
Opened	Closed	Metro area or city	Municipality/ Neighborhood	State	Mall	Current name (Liverpool)	Sq m (2022)	Other Name (2016)
1999		Acapulco		Gro.	Galerías Acapulco	Acapulco Galerías	10,852	Fábricas de Francia Acapulco
1986		Aguascalientes		Ags.	Villasunción	Ags. Villasunción	6,094	Fábricas de Francia Aguascalientes
1999		Veracruz	Boca del Río	Ver.	(Soriana-anchored center)	Boca del Rio	5,085	Fábricas de Francia Boca del Rio
2000		Chihuahua		Chih.	Chihuahua Fashion Mall		8,636	Fábricas de Francia Chihuahua
2002		Ciudad Obregón		Son.		Ciudad Obregón	6,447	Fábricas de Francia Ciudad Obregón
1997		Coatzacoalcos		Tab.		Coatzacoalcos	7,969	Fábricas de Francia Coatzacoalcos
2017		Comitán		Chis.	Plaza Las Flores Comitan	Comitán	?	Fábricas de Francia Comitán
1997		Córdoba		Ver.		Córdoba Crystal	6,922	Fábricas de Francia Córdoba
2015		Cuautla		Mor.		Cuautla	5,283	Fábricas de Francia Cuautla
1878/ 1899/ 1951		Guadalajara		Jal.		Guadalajara Centro	8,275	Fábricas de Francia Gdl. Centro
1999		Guadalajara		Jal.	Gran Plaza		10,235	Fábricas de Francia Gdl. Gran Plaza
1974		Guadalajara		Jal.	Plaza Patria		8,641	Fábricas de Francia Gdl. Plaza Patria
1969	2021	Guadalajara	Zapopan	Jal.	Plaza del Sol	Plaza del Sol (closed)	8,255	Fábricas de Francia Plaza del Sol
1963		Mazatlán		Sin.	c/ Juárez y Cenizares	Mazatlán Centro	?	Fábricas de Francia Mazatlán
2016		Mexico City	Tecámac	Méx.	Tecámac Power Center	Tecámac	5,366	Fábricas de Francia Mexico Tecamac
2002		Oaxaca		Oax.		Oaxaca	10,034	Fábricas de Francia Oaxaca
2017		Oaxaca		Oax.	Plaza Bella	Oaxaca Plaza Bella	?	Fábricas de Francia Oaxaca Plaza Bella
1997		Poza Rica		Ver.		Poza Rica	5,567	Fábricas de Francia Poza Rica
1997		Puebla		Pue.		Puebla Crystal	6,186	Fábricas de Francia Puebla
2015		Salamanca		Gto.		Salamanca	5,721	Fábricas de Francia Salamanca
1999		Tapachula		Chis.		Tapachula	7,496	Fábricas de Francia Tapachula
1961		Tepic		Nay.		Tepic Centro	7,520	Fábricas de Francia Tepic
1997		Villahermosa		Tab.	Plaza Crystal	Villahermosa Crystal	5,267	Fábricas de Francia Villahermosa
1997		Xalapa		Ver.	Plaza Américas	Xalapa Plaza Américas	6,660	Fábricas de Francia Xalapa

Source: Tiendas ("Stores"), Liverpool website and p. 43, 2022 Annual Report

Table of Fábricas de Francia stores (2018) converted to Suburbia
Year opened as FdF	Metropolitan area	Municipality or Neighborhood	State	Mall or address	Converted to	Area (2016, sqm)
2000	Ciudad Juárez		Chih.	Rio Grande Mall	Suburbia Ciudad Juárez	6,768
2016	Los Mochis		Sin.	Plaza Sendero Los Mochis	Suburbia Los Mochis	8,873
1999	Mazatlán		Sin.	Gran Plaza Mazatlán	Suburbia Mazatlán	
2014	Mexico City	Tlalnepantla	Mexico City	Centro Lago De Guadalupe	Suburbia Lago de Guadalupe	5,087
2014	Mexico City	Iztapalapa	Mexico City	Plaza Central	Suburbia México Plaza Central	4,972
2017	Mexico City	Colonia Buenavista	Mexico City	Forum Buenavista	Suburbia México Buenavista	
2016	Mexico City	Nicolás Romero	Méx.	Town Center Vista Hermosa	Suburbia México Nicolás Romero	4,905
2015	Mexico City	Texcoco	Méx.	Puerta Texcoco	Suburbia Texcoco Puerta	4,929
2017	Mexico City	Valle de Chalco	Méx.	Patio Valle de Chalco	Suburbia Valle de Chalco	
2015	Mexico City	Zumpango	Méx.	Town Center Zumpango	Suburbia Zumpango	4,810
2017	Saltillo		Coah.	Plaza Sendero Sur	Suburbia Saltillo Sendero	5,071
2016	Tijuana	La Presa Este	B.C.	Plaza Sendero	Suburbia Tijuana	5,017
2017	Tlaxcala	Apizaco	Tlax.	Plaza Apizaco	Suburbia Apizaco	6,200
2017	Tonalá		Jal.	Plaza Lomas	Suburbia Tonalá	
2016	Tuxtepec	Centro	Oax.	Centro, Juárez 901	Suburbia Tuxtepec	4,726
2016	Uriangato		Gto.	Galerías Metropolitana	Suburbia Uriangato	4,770

Table of Fábricas de Francia stores (2018) permanently closed
Year opened as FdF	Metropolitan area	Municipality or Neighborhood	State	Mall or address	Area (2016, sqm)
1999	León	(Zona Norte)	Gto.	La Gran Plaza	10,880
	Zona metropolitana del Valle de México	Tlalnepantla de Baz	Mex.	Lagos de Guadalupe	
2015	Zona metropolitana del Valle de México	Chimalhuacán	Méx.	Plaza Chimalhuacán	5,027
