= Émile Gilbert =

French architect

Émile-Jacques Gilbert (3 September 1795 – 31 October 1874) was a 19th-century French architect.

In 1838 Gilbert was commissioned to reconstruct the hospital for the insane at Charenton along modern more humane lines recommended by Jean-Étienne Dominique Esquirol; the new structure was completed in 1845. In 1843 Gilbert, as Architect of the City of Paris, was commissioned to erect the first of the model penitentiaries following designs of Guillaume-Abel Blouet, the Mazas Prison, in Paris. In 1858 he was commissioned to build the new Hôtel Dieu opposite Notre Dame on the Île de la Cité, Paris.
