= Philibert of Jumièges =

French monk and abbot (c. 608–684)

Saint Philibert of Jumièges
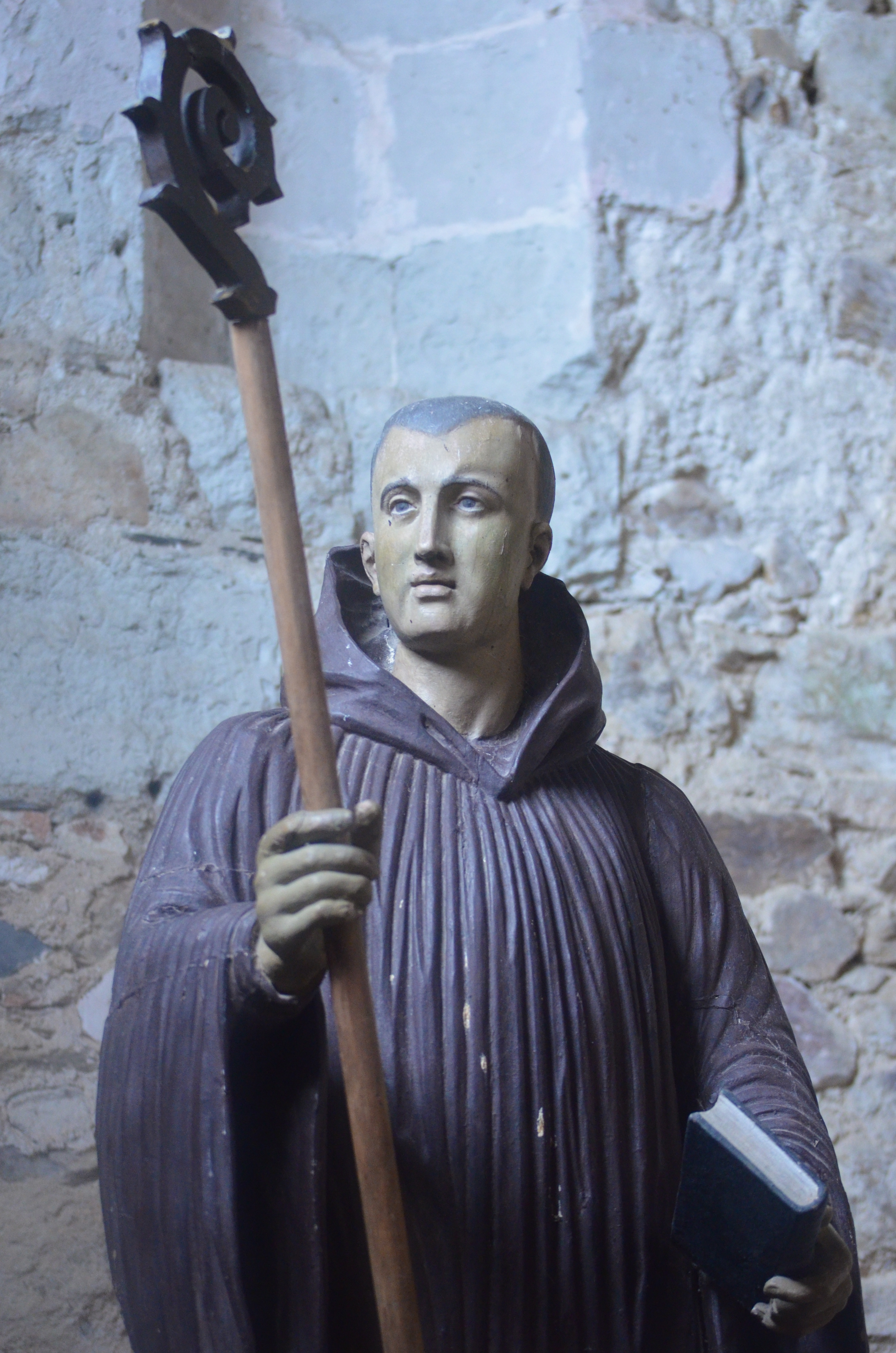
- Statue of Saint Philibert
- Born: C.608; Gascony
- Died: C.684
- Venerated in: Eastern Orthodox Church and Roman Catholic Church
- Feast: August 20

Philibert of Jumièges (c. 608–684) was an abbot and monastic founder, particularly associated with Jumièges Abbey.

== Life ==
Philibert was born in Gascony, the only son of Filibaud, a magistrate of Vicus Julius (now Aire-sur-l'Adour). When he came of age he was given a place at the court of Dagobert I at Metz, where he met Saints Ouen and Wandregisel. He received permission of the king to become a monk and entered the monastery of Rebais, which had been founded by Ouen and his brothers on land donated by the king. In 650, he succeeded his friend Agilus as abbot, but internal disagreements arose as to the more or less rigorous practice of the rule of Columbanus. He left and spent some time traveling round monasteries including Luxeuil and Bobbio, studying their Rules and constitutions.

=== Jumièges ===
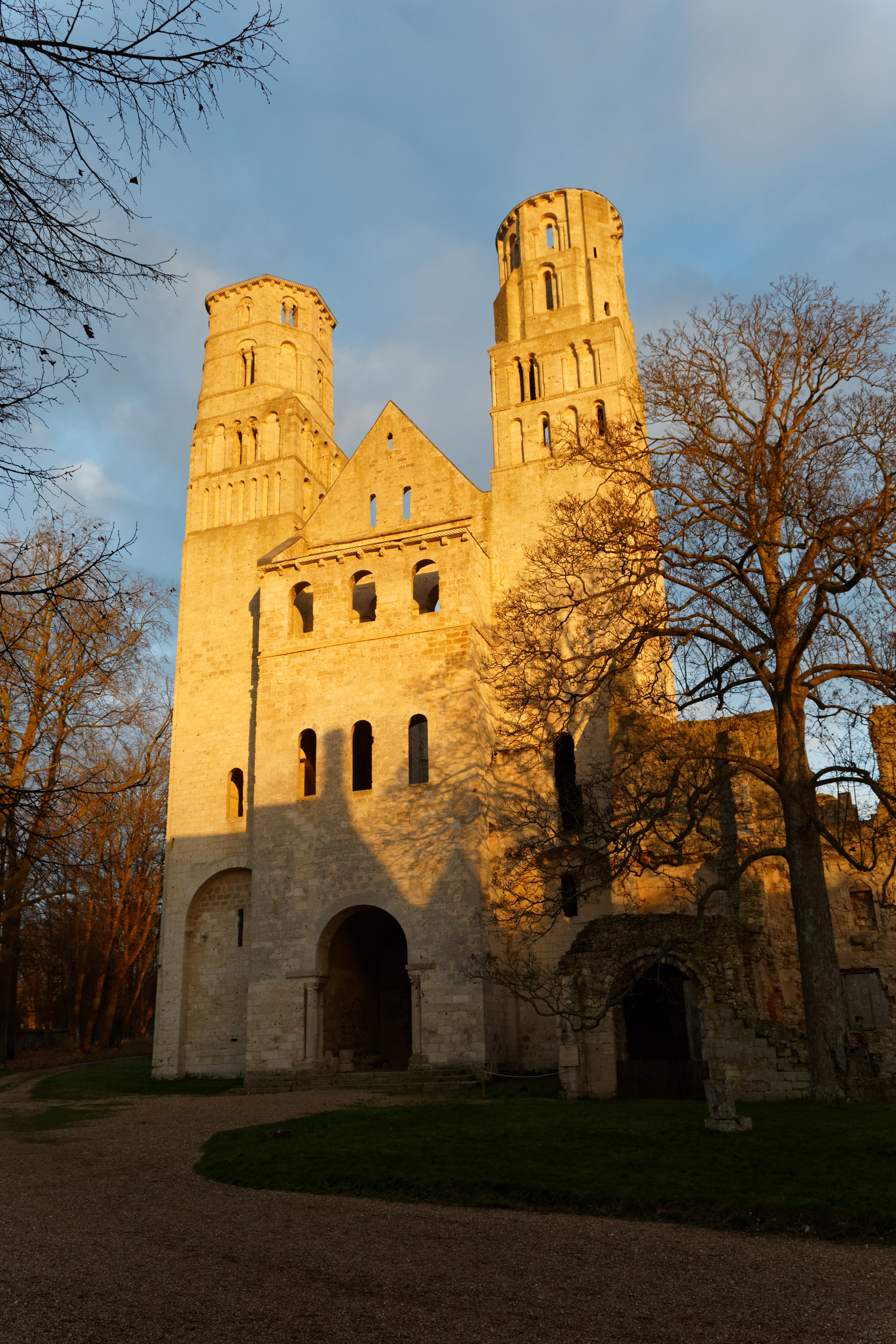
Jumièges

In 654, through the influence of Queen Balthild of Chelles, Philibert received a gift of land from Clovis II on which he founded Notre Dame de Jumièges. He drew up a Rule based on his studies for this and for his later foundations, drawing on several earlier Rules, including those of Benedict, Macarius, Basil the Great and particularly the strict rule of Columbanus. The monks' chief work was the reclaiming of waste lands. He welcomed the poor and pilgrims. An important spiritual place, Jumièges became renowned and several notables and abbots came to consult Philibert.

Philibert did not hesitate to confront Ebroin, the mayor of the palace of Neustria, about his treatment of Leodegar, Bishop of Autun, who had died a martyr. Ebroin then saw to it that for a time Philibert lost the favour of Ouen and the royal family. He was briefly imprisoned then not permitted to return to Jumieges. He chose exile from Neustria and withdrew to Austrasia and the court of Bishop Ansoald of Poitiers who put his own foundation of Luçon Abbey under Philibert's charge.

=== Noirmoutier ===
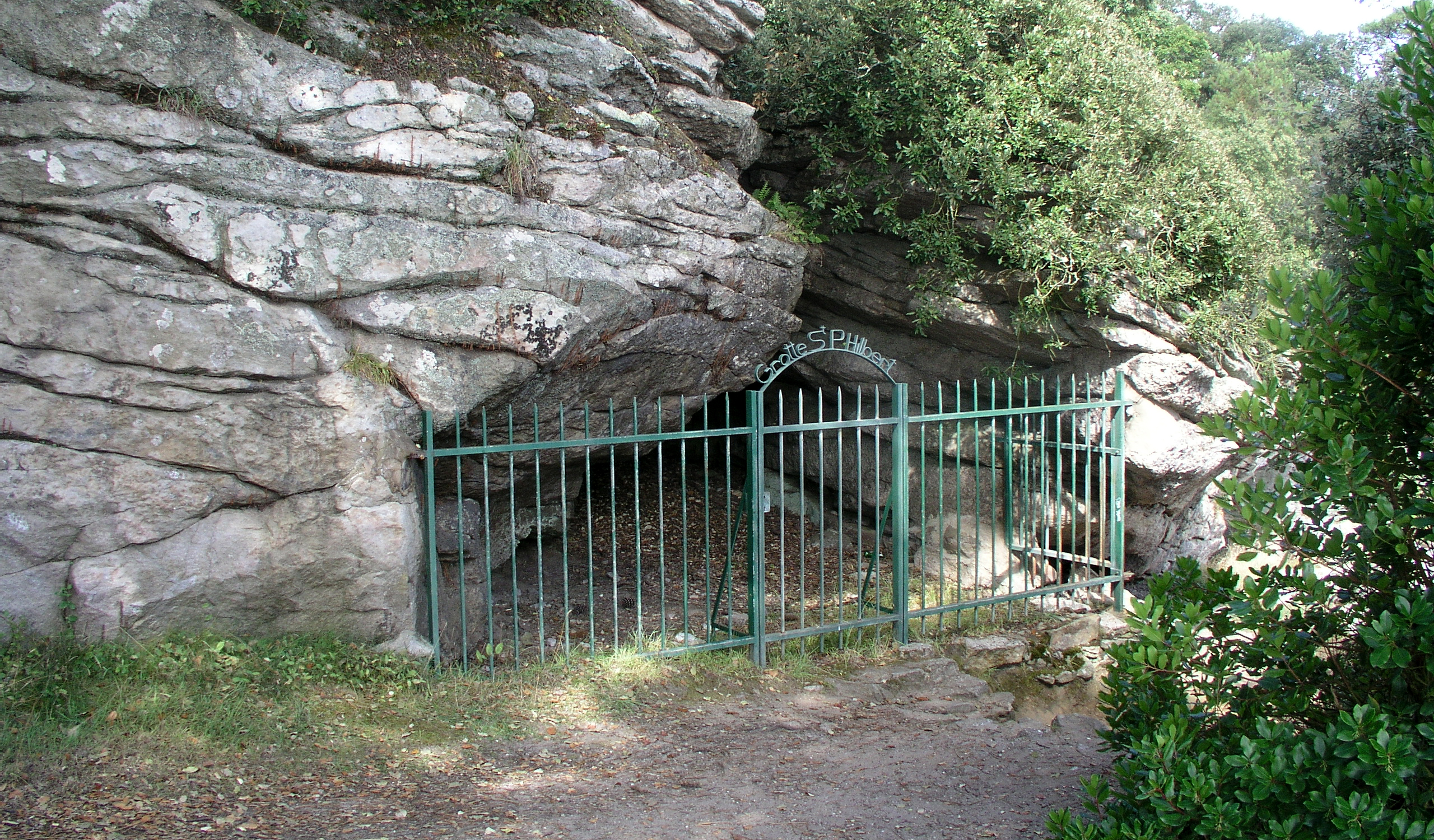
Grotto of Saint Philbert, Noirmoutier

Around 676, Philibert decided to found a new monastery on the island of Her (Noirmoutier) with the agreement of the bishop Ansoald who granted him some land. On the island, in addition to evangelization, the monks carried out important work: agricultural development, irrigation, communication routes, salt exploitation, and construction of monastic buildings. The bishop also gave him land at Déas which became the abbey of Saint-Philbert-de-Grand-Lieu. (Around 847, the monks of Noirmoutier built a Carolingian priory church in Saint-Philbert-de-Grand-Lieu in his honor.) Five years later, still with the bishop of Poitiers, he developed, with monks from Noirmoutier, a priory that would become the royal abbey of Saint-Michel-en-l'Herm, partly at the origin of the Marais Poitevin.

== Later life ==
After the death of Ebroin in 681, Philibert returned briefly to Jumieges, but did not stay as he was by then deeply involved with Noirmoutier. Before leaving the place for the last time, he reconciled with his friend Saint Ouen. When he regained the favour of his patrons, he founded other houses, including the nunneries at Pavilly and in 682 Montivilliers Abbey. On his return, he continued supervising his various foundations. Philibert died and was buried at Heriou.

== Veneration ==
In 836 the monks of Noirmoutier abandoned their home in the face of the Viking attacks to seek refuge on the mainland, in 875 finally settling with the relics of Philibert in the abbey at Tournus named in his honour, where the great church of St Philibert at Tournus still stands. This translation by the monks of Noirmoutier gave rise to several foundations and numerous Carolingian endowments, creating a large monastic network.

The relics of the saint are kept in the choir of the Saint-Philibert abbey of Tournus, inside a reliquary, the work of the artist Goudji. They were desecrated on January 25, 1998; the skull of the saint and two of his bones having been stolen.

Among those inspired by Philibert's example was the Irish monk Sidonius of Jumieges, who founded the monastery at Saint-Saëns.

Philibert of Jumièges' feast day is 20 August. The filbert, or hazelnut, is said to have been named after him, since it ripens about August 20 in England.

Villages bear his name in the Rhone Valley, in Anjou, in Normandy and in Brittany.

== Sources ==
- Farmer, David (ed.), 2004. Oxford Dictionary of Saints. Oxford: OUP (5th edn).
- Krusch, B. (ed.). Vita Filiberti (Monumenta Germaniae Historica, Scriptores Rerum Merovingicarum V, pp. 568–606).
- Poupardin, R., 1905. Monuments de l'histoire des abbayes de saint Philibert.

== See also ==
Saint-Philibert de Noirmoutier Abbey
