= Noirmoutier Abbey =

Catholic abbey in France

Noirmoutier Abbey aka Abbey of St Philibert, Noirmoutier Abbaye Saint-Philibert de Noirmoutier
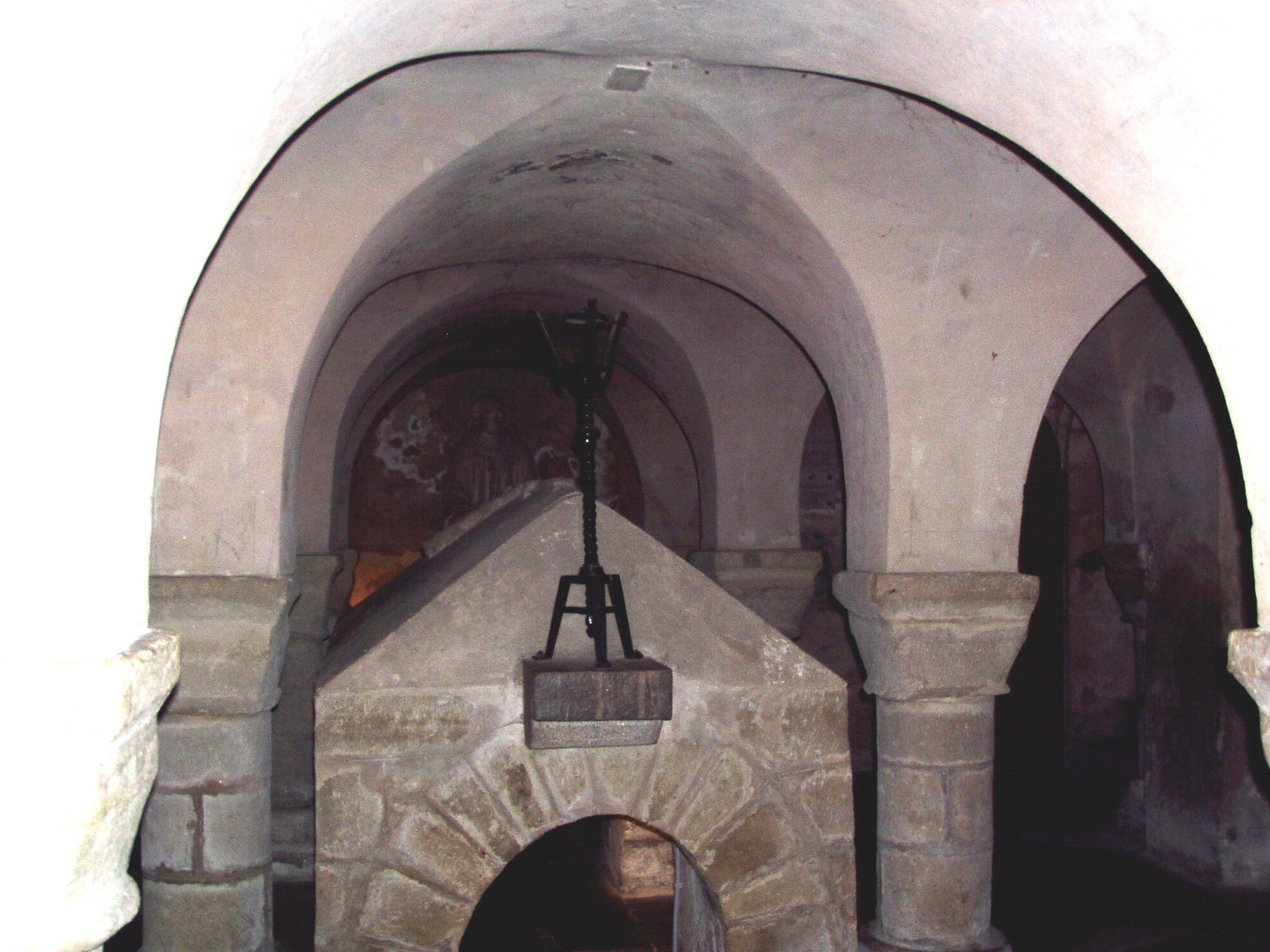
- The crypt.

- Location within Pays de la Loire

Religion
- Affiliation: Catholic church
- District: Noirmoutier-en-l'Île
- Province: Vendée
- Region: Pays de la Loire

Location
- Country: France
- Coordinates: 47°0′1.06″N 2°14′27.85″W

Architecture
- Destroyed: 18th century

Noirmoutier Abbey otherwise the Abbey of Saint Philibert, Noirmoutier (French: Abbaye Saint-Philibert de Noirmoutier) was a Benedictine monastery founded in 674 on the island of Noirmoutier by Philibert of Jumièges or of Tournus, who died there on August 20, 684.

== History ==
Philibert, in conflict with Ébroïn, mayor of the Neustrian palace, had to leave the abbey at Jumièges near Rouen which he had founded. He was welcomed by the bishop of Poitiers, Ansoald, whom he helped to evangelize his diocese, and then withdrew with a few monks from Jumièges to the island of Her, now Noirmoutier. On July 1, 677, Ansoald gave the monks his villa at Déas and other lands that would enable the development of the abbey.

First called Herio, then Hermoutier, the monastery took the name Noirmoutier from the color of the Benedictine monks who lived there. The monastery made its living from salt marshes and farming, and traded with the mainland via its port. The abbey flourished until it was destroyed by the Saracens in 732. In 799, a Scandinavian fleet attacked and plundered the monastery.

Noirmoutier Abbey was re-established in 804 by Louis the Pious, King of Aquitaine. It was pillaged several times between 814 and 819 by the Normans. The monks built a new abbey at Déas, on the shores of Lac de Grand-Lieu, after obtaining authorization from Louis the Pious, now Emperor, to divert the Boulogne river in 819. Noirmoutier was again sacked by the Vikings in 824, 830 and 835, and the abbey was finally burnt down in 846. The island became a base for Viking operations on the Loire.

On June 7, 836, the monks left the island for Déas, carrying the reliquary containing the body of Saint Philibert. Driven out again by the Vikings in 847, they took refuge at the priory of Cunault-sur-Loire, which had been given to them as a retreat in 845. They took the relics of Saint Philbert there in 857, but had to flee again from the Normans in 862, to Messais in Poitou, on an estate donated by Charles the Bald. By 870, they were in Saint-Pourçain-sur-Sioule in Auvergne, arriving in Tournus, in the Mâconnais region, in 875 after a long peregrination with the relics of their holy founder. Here, they founded the Abbey of St Philibert. The monastery at Noirmoutier was reduced to a priory under the abbey at Tournus around the year 1000.

In 1172, a community of Cistercian monks settled on the Île du Pilier, then obtained a charter from Lord Pierre IV de Beauvoir to establish themselves in Noirmoutier in 1205. To the north of the island, the monks built the Abbey de la Blanche, named after the color of their vestments. The abbey, part of the diocese of Luçon, remained in existence until the French Revolution in 1789.

== Architecture ==
The only remains of the old buildings are the Merovingian crypt beneath the parish church of Saint-Philibert in Noirmoutier-en-l'Île.

== Abbots ==
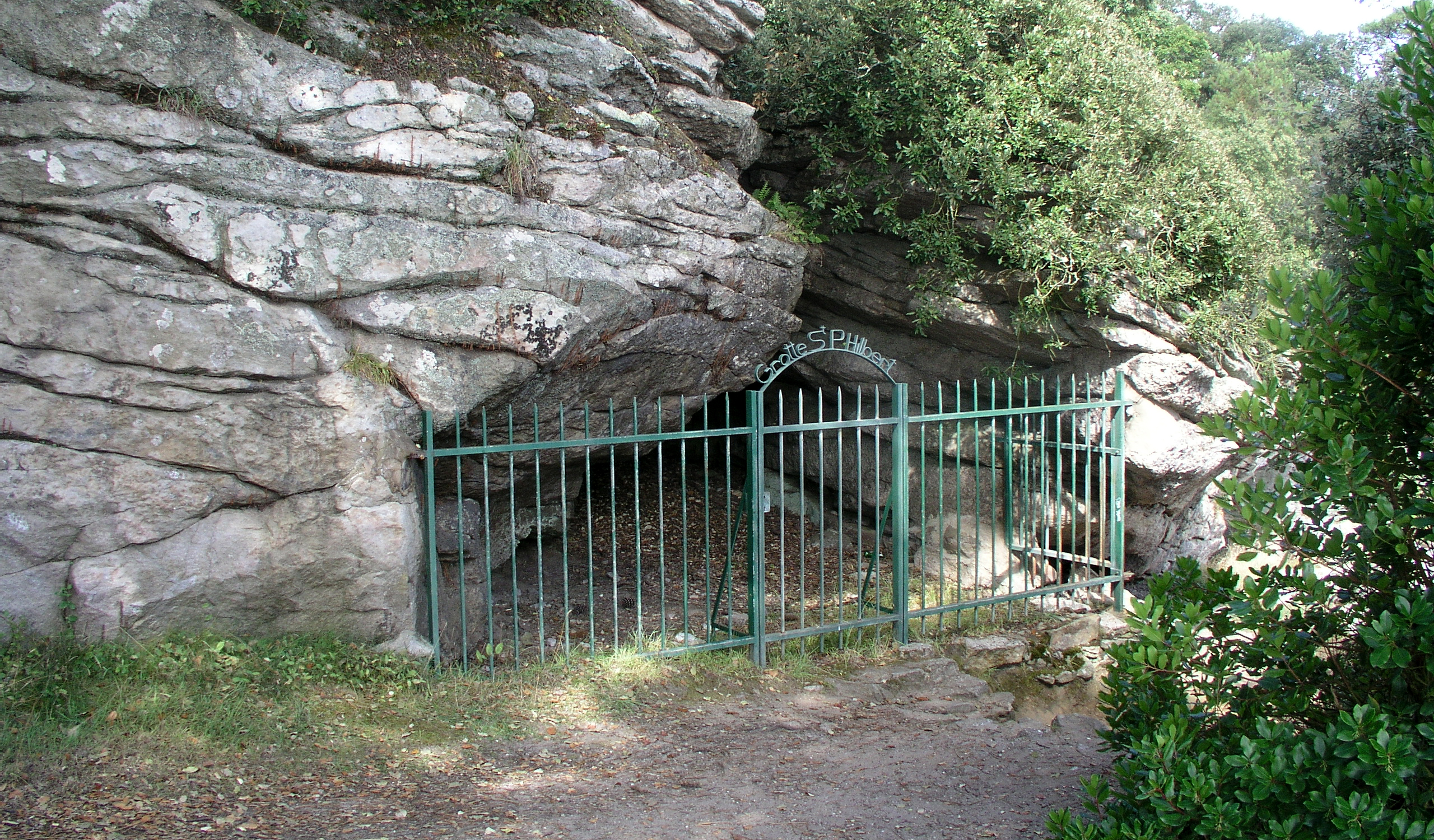
The grotto of Saint Philbert is located in the Bois de la Chaise on the east coast of the island of Noirmoutier.

(non-exhaustive list)

- 674-684 - Philibert of Jumièges, otherwise Philibert of Tournus, who died there on August 20, 684.
- Before 815-825 - Arnulf, builder of the abbey of Saint-Philbert-de-Grand-Lieu
- 825-854 (at Cunault Priory) - Hibold, the abbot who decided on and led the translation of Saint Philibert's relics from 836, under pressure from Viking and Breton attacks.

== Famous monks ==
- Geilo of Tournus, abbot in 875, later bishop of Langres.
