= Saint-Philbert-de-Grand-Lieu =

Saint-Philbert-de-Grand-Lieu Sant-Filberzh-Deaz
- Commune
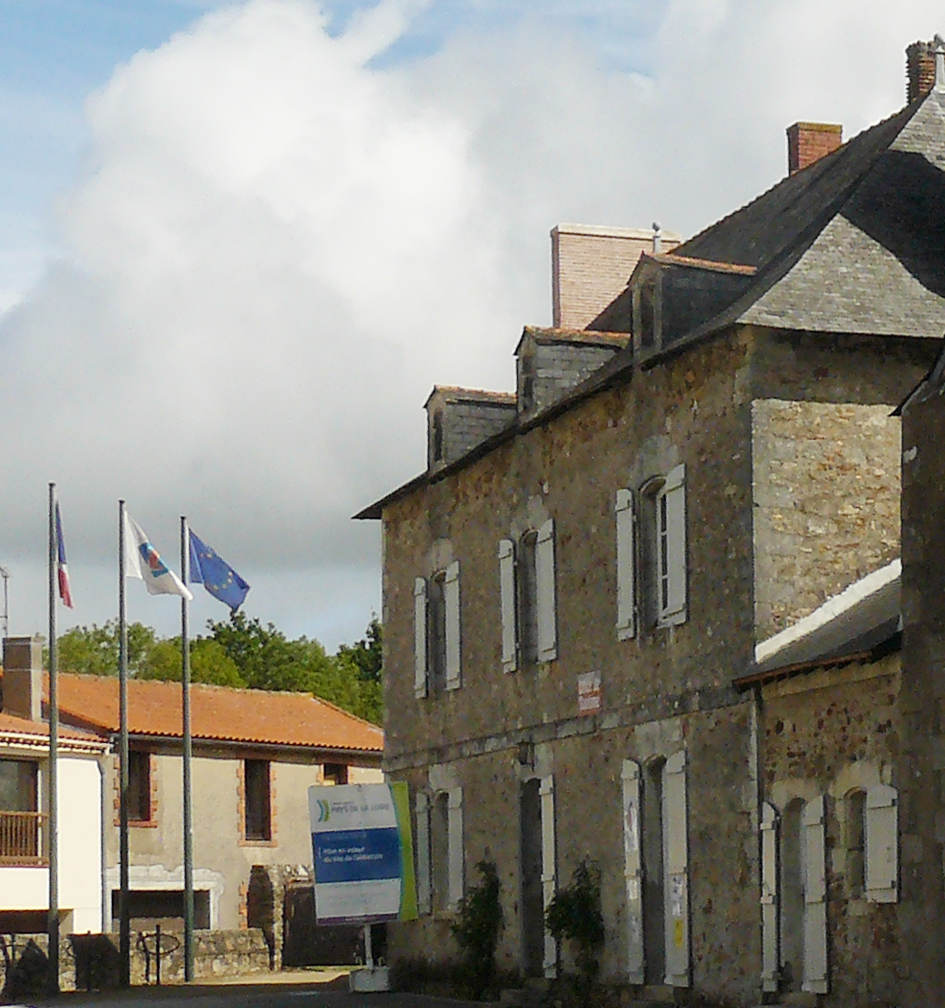
- The priory of the old abbey, now converted into a tourist office

- Coat of arms
- Location of Saint-Philbert-de-Grand-Lieu
- Location within France Location within Pays de la Loire
- Coordinates: 47°02′09″N 1°38′19″W
- Country: France
- Region: Pays de la Loire
- Department: Loire-Atlantique
- Arrondissement: Nantes
- Canton: Saint-Philbert-de-Grand-Lieu
- Intercommunality: Grand Lieu

Government
  - Mayor (2020–2026): Stephan Beaugé
- Area^{1}: 58.81 km^{2} (22.71 sq mi)
- Elevation: 8 m (26 ft)
- Highest elevation: 51 m (167 ft)
- Lowest elevation: 0 m (0 ft)
- Population (2023): 9,400
  - Density: 160/km^{2} (410/sq mi)
- Time zone: UTC+01:00 (CET)
  - Summer (DST): UTC+02:00 (CEST)
- INSEE/Postal code: 44188 /44310
- ^{1} French Land Register data, which excludes lakes, ponds, glaciers > 1 km^{2} (0.386 sq mi or 247 acres) and river estuaries.

Saint-Philbert-de-Grand-Lieu (French pronunciation: [sɛ̃ filbɛʁ də ɡʁɑ̃ ljø]; Breton: Sant-Filberzh-Deaz) is a commune in the Loire-Atlantique department in western France.

It is about 400 km southwest of Paris, via Chartres, Le Mans, Angers, and Nantes. The town is twinned with the Welsh suburb of Radyr in Cardiff, Wales's Capital.

== Population ==
Historical population
Year	Pop.	±% p.a.
1968	3,341	—
1975	3,633	+1.20%
1982	4,255	+2.28%
1990	5,159	+2.44%
1999	6,253	+2.16%
2007	7,465	+2.24%
2012	8,434	+2.47%
2017	8,921	+1.13%
2023	9,400	+0.88%
Source: INSEE

== Related persons ==
Vicomte Bertrand Jochaud du Plessix, a lieutenant in the Free French Forces, reposes in the local cemetery. He died along with three comrades on 30 June 1940 when they were shot down by the Spanish while attempting to land their aircraft in Gibraltar. He was first buried at Gibraltar, and was reinterred in Saint-Philbert-de-Grand-Lieu. He was awarded Compagnon de la Libération posthumously in May 1941.

His daughter is the American writer Francine du Plessix Gray.

== See also ==
- Communes of the Loire-Atlantique department
- Church of Saint-Philbert-de-Grand-Lieu
- Saint-Philibert de Noirmoutier Abbey
