= Eduard August Rübel =

Swiss American botanist and politician (1876–1960)

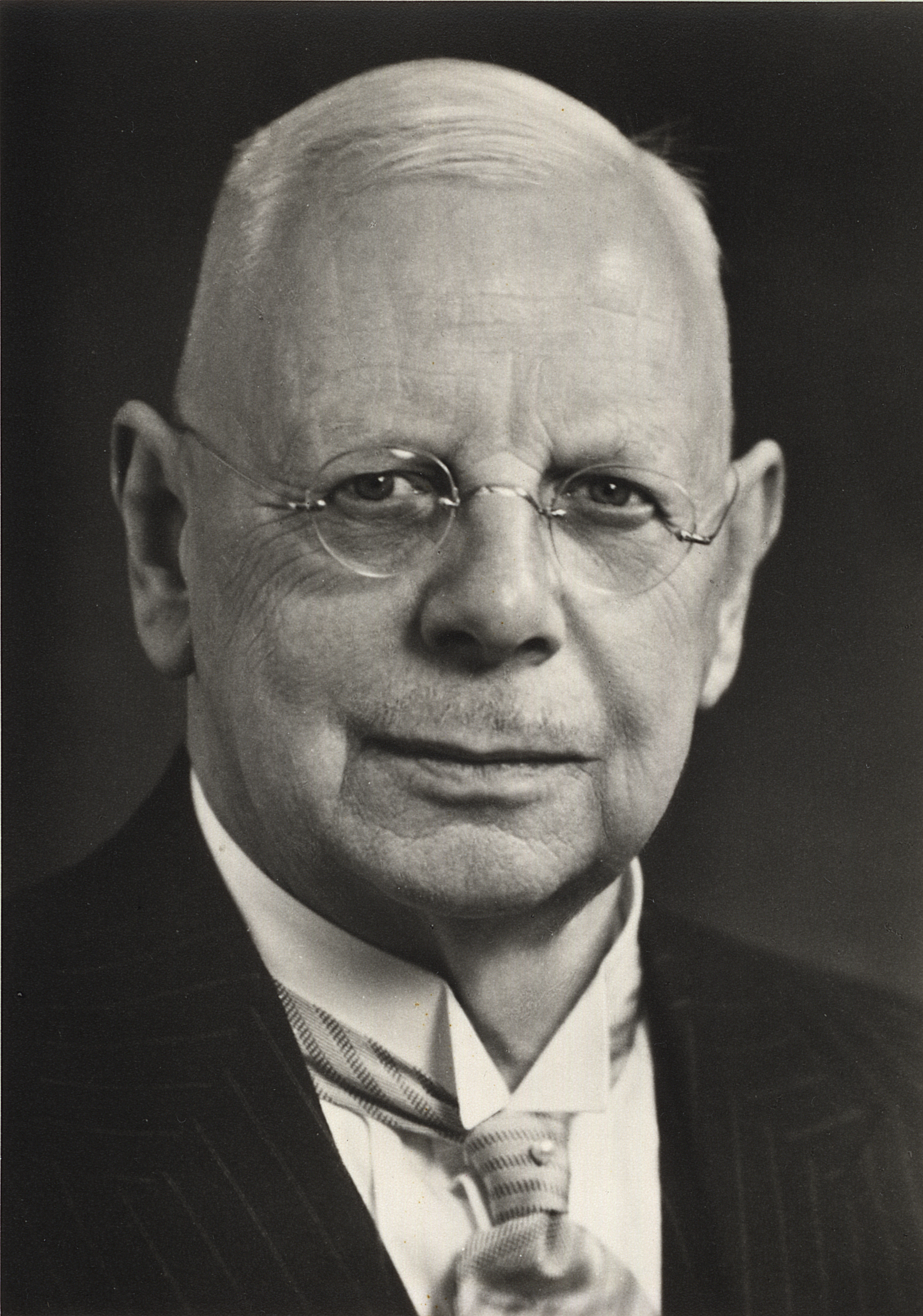

Member of the Cantonal Council of Zürich
- In office 1 January 1926 – 31 December 1926
- Constituency: Zürich

Personal details
- Born: Eduard August Rübel; 18 July 1876 Zürich, Switzerland
- Died: 24 June 1960 (aged 83) Zürich, Switzerland
- Citizenship: United States (until 1899); Switzerland (since 1899)
- Relations: Alex Rübel (grandson)
- Children: 3
- Education: ETH Zurich (PhD)
- Occupation: Botanist, professor, genealogist, politician

Eduard August Rübel (German: [ˈryːbl̩]; 18 July 1876 – 24 June 1960) was a Swiss American botanist, professor, genealogist and politician who served on the Cantonal Council of Zürich for one legislative period in 1926. Most notably Rübel has been the founder of the Rübel Geobotanical Research Institute as well as full professor at ETH Zurich. He is the grandfather of Alex Rübel, long-term president of Zürich Zoo.

== Early life and education ==
Rübel was born 18 July 1876 in Zürich, Switzerland, the youngest of five children, to August Rübel (1827–1892), a German-born American citizen originally from Elberfeld, and Brazilian-born Swiss Rosalie Däniker (1838–1896).

His father was a silk merchant who relocated to Switzerland in the 1850s and became a partner with Carl Abegg-Arter, once the richest Swiss citizen, forming Abegg & Co. His mother was born in Rio de Janeiro to Swiss parents. Through her marriage, she lost Swiss citizenship in 1858. Most of his family remained American citizens, however, Eduard August naturalized in Zürich in 1899.

He completed a doctorate at ETH Zurich.

== Personal life ==
In 1908, he married Anne Luise Blass (*1882), a daughter of H. Friedrich Blass (1848–1928), a merchant, and Anna Luise Blass (née Kitt). The Blass family was well-established in Zurich society and her father belonged to two city guilds. They had three children;

- Rosalie Rübel (*1909)
- Cécile Rübel (*1918)
- Hans-Ulrich Martin Rübel (1919–2014), who married Sophia Dorothea von Schulthess-Rechberg, of nobility. His son is Alex Rübel (*1955) who would later serve as president of Zürich Zoo.

Rübel died on 24 June 1960 in Zürich aged 83.
