= August Rübel =

German-born American businessman and silk merchant (1827-1892)

- August Rübel portrait by Rudolf Ganz, Zürich
- Born: 1827; Elberfeld, Kingdom of Prussia
- Died: 1892 (aged 64–65); Zürich, Switzerland
- Citizenship: American
- Occupation(s): Businessman, silk merchant
- Known for: Founding and leading Maggi; Co-founding Abegg & Rübel
- Spouse: Rosalie Däniker (m. 1858)
- Children: 4, including Eduard August

August Rübel (September 20, 1827 – October 10, 1892) was a German-born American businessman and silk merchant. Together with Carl Abegg-Arter, he founded the companies Maggi and Abegg & Rübel in the late nineteenth century.

== Early life ==
Rübel was born on September 20, 1827, in Elberfeld, Kingdom of Prussia, to Johann Peter Rübel (1781–1865) and Anna Gertrud Rübel (née Kamp; 1791–1871). His father was a wealthy farmer who also was a yarn manufacturer.

== Career ==
Ultimately, Rübel became a merchant and emigrated to the United States, where he was primarily active in silk trading in New York City and Philadelphia.

== Personal life ==
In 1858, Rübel married Rosalie Däniker (1838–1896), a daughter of Johann Heinrich Däniker and Katharina Cäcilia Däniker (née Haller). Rosalie was born in Rio de Janeiro, Brazil as her father, a merchant, had business there in the 1830s. The Däniker family was well-established in the city of Zürich and belonged to several guilds. They had four children;

- Helene Rübel (born 1862), never married
- Cäcilie Rübel (born 1863), never married
- Alexander Rübel (1867–1912), married to Florence Taber Toel (1876–1917), of New York City, three children.
- Eduard August Rübel (1876–1960), married to Anna Luise Blass (1882–1978), three children.

Rübel died in 1892 at Plantanenhof in Zürich, Switzerland. He remained a U.S. citizen for the majority of his life, only his youngest son became a Swiss citizen in Zürich in 1899.
