= Julius Müller (businessman) =

American diplomat and businessman (1886–1970)

Honorary Consul of Japan to Zurich, Switzerland
- In office 1956 – 1970 (his death)
- Succeeded by: Richard Georges Müller

Personal details
- Born: Julius Müller; August 15, 1886 Wülflingen, Switzerland (now Winterthur, Switzerland)
- Died: November 28, 1970 (aged 84) Zollikon, Switzerland
- Citizenship: Swiss; American (since 1950)
- Spouses: Hatsu Sugiyama (m. 1914; div. 1942) Anna Borisovna Sverchkov (m. 1947)
- Relations: George H. Mueller (grandson)
- Children: 3
- Occupation: Businessman, industrialist, philanthropist, diplomat

Julius Müller anglicized Julius Mueller (August 15, 1886 – November 28, 1970) was a Swiss-born American businessman, industrialist, philanthropist and diplomat who was appointed Honorary Consul General to Zurich, Switzerland serving from 1956 to 1970.

== Personal life ==
In 1914, Mueller firstly married Japanese-born Hatsu "Hatsyko" Sugiyama (1895–1949), who was originally from Kyoto, with whom he had three children all born in Japan;

- Amy Mueller (born 1915), married Claude Barbey, of Geneva.
- Henry Julius Mueller (1917–1977), married Elsbeth Büchi (1924–1998), two children.
- Richard Georges Mueller (1919–1994), married Claire Müller, three sons. who would succeed his father in the role as Honorary Consul of Japan, one of his children is George H. Mueller, who inherited the post in the third generation.

In 1942, Mueller divorced his first wife. He ultimately relocated to New York City where he built another subsidiary of his company. In 1947, he married secondly to Anna Borisovna Sverchkov (1909–2003), a daughter of Boris Isidorovich Sverchkov and Olga Viktorovna Sverchkov (née Obakevich), of Saint Petersburg. It was her third marriage.

Mueller permanently settled in the U.S., to focus on the development of his business of tool imports, residing in Great Neck, New York on Long Island. In 1950, Mueller became a naturalized U.S. citizen.

In 1964, Mueller established the Julius Mueller Stiftung, a private foundation through which he donated 1 million Swiss Francs (equivalent to 3–4 million Swiss Francs in 2026) for cancer research as well as 40,000 Swiss Francs annually. He donated his Japanese brash collection to the Rietberg Museum. He was a member of Swiss Society of New York, the Swiss Benevolent Society and the Pestalozzi Foundation of America.

Mueller died at his residence in Zollikon, Switzerland on November 28, 1970 aged 84.
