= Edmund Koken =

German painter (1814–1872)

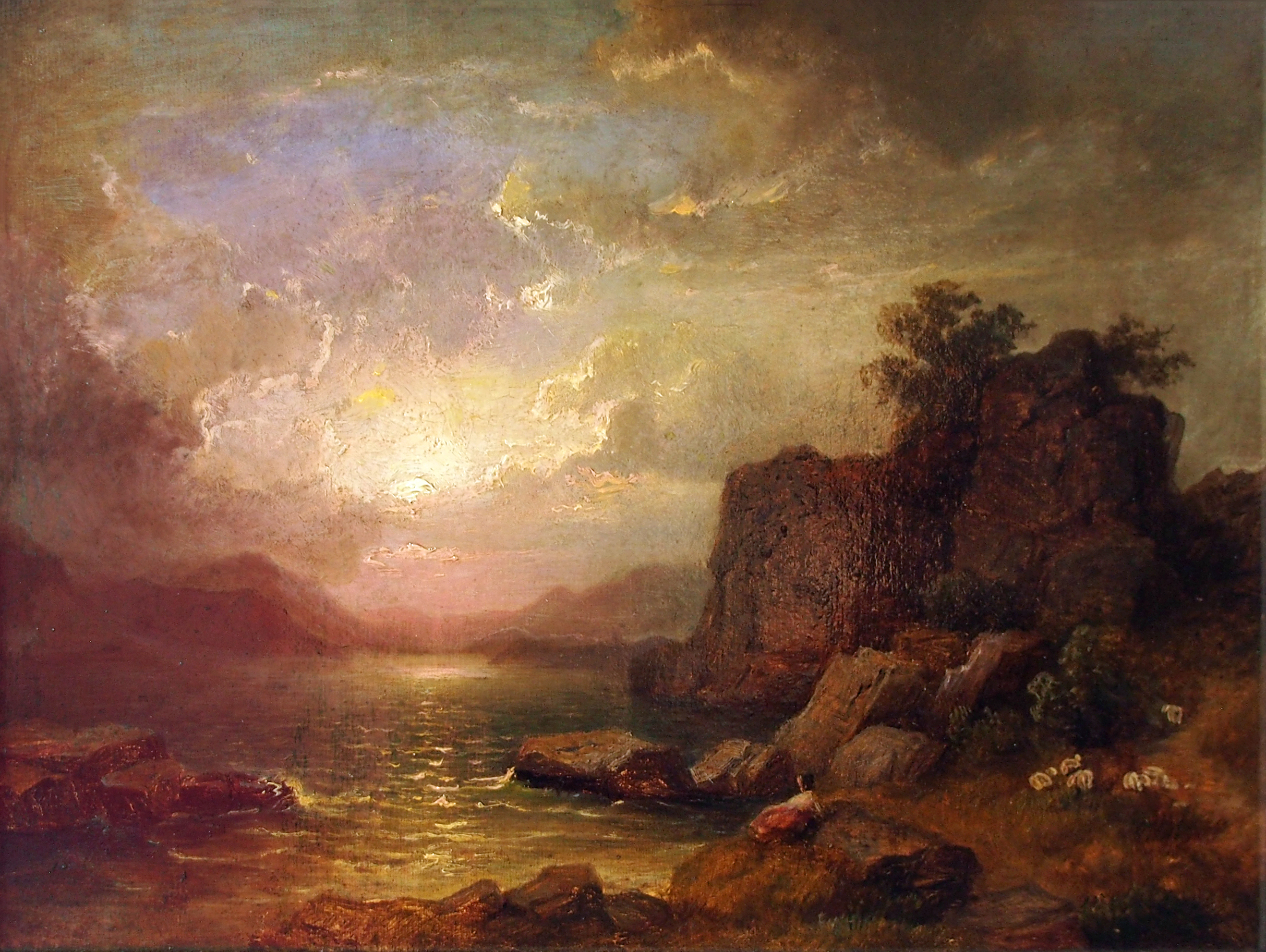
Sunset at lake Garda

Johann Gottfried Edmund Koken (4 June 1814, Hanover - 30 October 1872, Hanover) was a German landscape and portrait painter.

== Biography ==
He was born to Edmund Burchard Theophilus Koken, a professional soldier with twenty-two years of service, and his second wife, Ilsa Maria née Nieren. His first wife had died in childbirth. After his death in 1832, Ilsa became a laundress for the royal family, to support Edmund and his eight siblings.

Thanks to his mother's position, he was able to attend the Court School, followed by training at a trade school.

In 1837, he went to Munich to continue his studies at the Academy of Fine Arts. There he became friends with August von Kreling. His teachers included Peter von Cornelius, Julius Schnorr von Carolsfeld and Wilhelm von Kaulbach. He was heavily influenced by Carl Rottmann.

In 1841, he returned to Hanover. The following year, he was one of the founders of the Hannoverscher Künstlerverein. In 1845, he took an extensive trip to Italy, where he met Oswald Achenbach. When he returned, he painted portraits of every Kunstlerverein member, which were published in a two-volume set.

In 1851. he married Wilhelmine Louise Meyer, the daughter of a Hanoverian state councilor. Their children included the painter Paul Koken. Other Koken family members who became artists include Edmund's nephew Gustav Koken, father of the graphic designer, Änne Koken.

Among his numerous students may be mentioned: Ernest Augustus, Crown Prince of Hanover, Karl Eckermann, the son of Goethe's secretary, Johann Peter Eckermann, and the landscape painter Gustav Hausmann.
