= Carl Julius Abegg =

Swiss businessman and industrialist

- Born: April 26, 1891; Switzerland
- Died: August 23, 1973 (aged 82); Zurich, Switzerland
- Other name: Carl Julius Abegg-Haegler
- Education: University of Zurich
- Occupations: Industrialist, businessman
- Known for: Owner of the family business Abegg & Co and director of major Swiss companies
- Spouse: Katharine "Katja" Weiss (m. 1917, divorced) Marie Louise Elisabeth "Lotti" Haegler (m. 1929)
- Children: 4

Carl Julius Abegg colloquially also Carl Julius Abegg-Haegler (26 April 1891 – 23 August 1973) was a Swiss industrialist, businessman and author. He was the grandson of Carl Abegg-Arter, who founded Abegg & Co.

== Early years ==
Abegg was born in 1891 in Switzerland. After completing his commercial training in Milan, Carl Julius Abegg joined his parents' business, Abegg & Co. In 1933. He received an honorary doctorate in Philosophy from the University of Zurich. He was also an active member of the Zunft zur Meisen guild in Zurich between 1913 and 1949.

== Career ==
He was active on numerous boards of directors: member of La Suisse Insurance Company (1929–1937), member of Maschinenfabrik Oerlikon (1930–1937), president of Nestlé (1937 and 1948–1961), vice president of Zurich Insurance Company (1937–1953), member of Credit Suisse (1940–1953), member of Zurich Chamber of Commerce (1941–1948), member of Elektrobank/ Elektrowatt (1951–1953), member of AIAG-Alusuisse (1957) and of the Swiss Reinsurance Company Swiss-Re (1957).

== Personal life ==
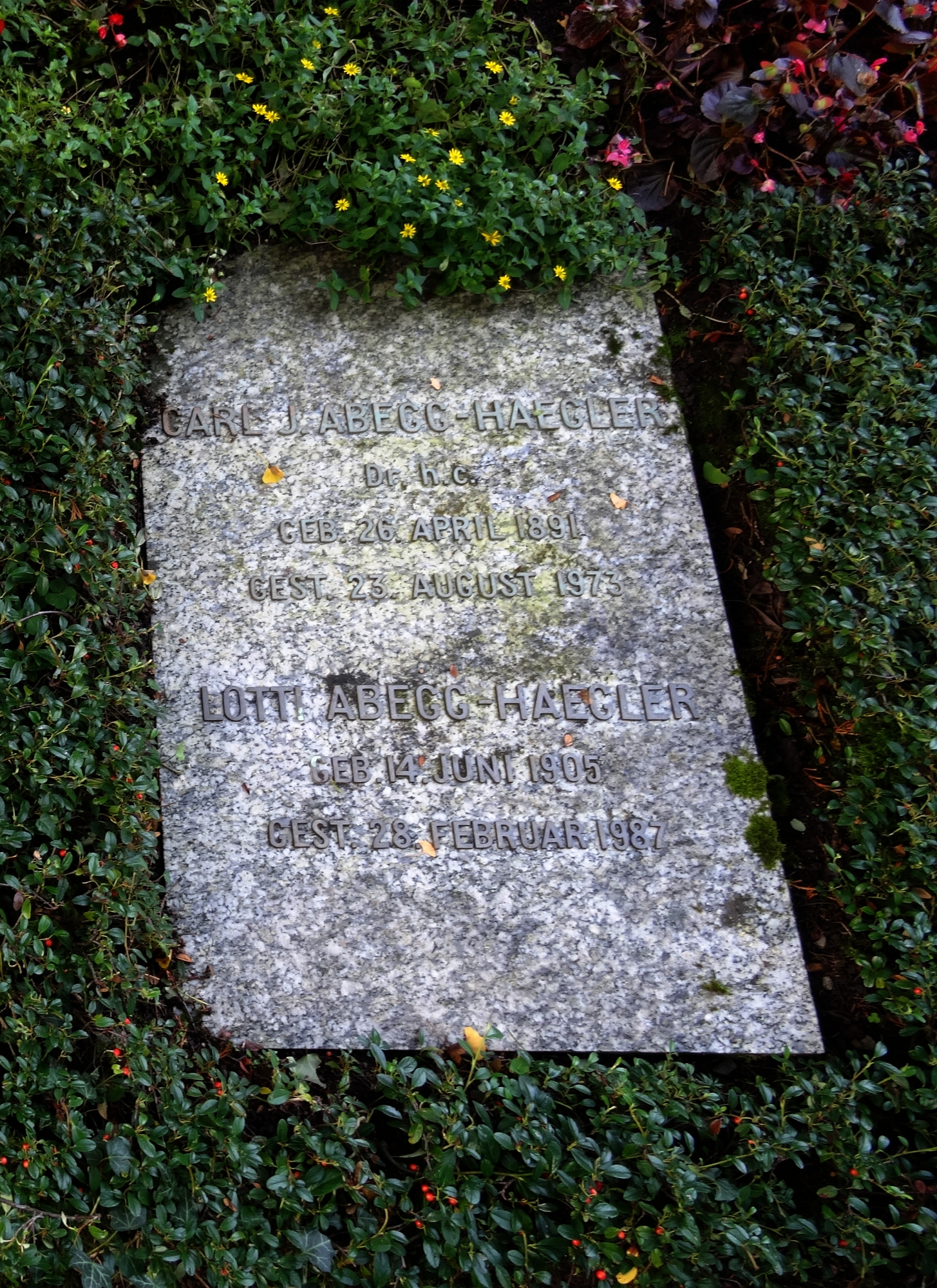
Abegg's grave in the Enzenbühl cemetery in Zurich

In 1917, Abegg firstly married Katharine "Katja" Weiss (1900–1991), a daughter of Karl Martin Weiss and Russian-born Nadescha Michailova, both in Moscow, Russia. They had one son;

- Carl Arter "Carlo" Abegg (1918–2000), married Canadian-born Marie de Boucherville (died 1981), a descendant of the founding families of Boucherville, Quebec, with issue.

In 1929, Abegg married secondly to Marie Louise Elisabeth "Lotti" Haegler (1905–1985), daughter of Eugen Haegler (1857–1922), a businessman and Colonel in the Swiss Army, and Henriette Adeline Haegler (née Rütschi; 1871–). The Haegler family was socially prominent and was later associated with the Geigy and Lemann families. They had four children;

- Katharina Abegg
- Odette Abegg, married Hans Riemann
- Raymonde Abegg (1934–2021), married Hans A. Syz (1927–1985), a banker and partner in private bank Maerki Baumann & Co, who was a son of American-born Hans Syz, with issue including Hans G. Syz (born 1957), a film producer and cinematographer.

Abegg passed away 23 August 1973 in Zurich, Switzerland aged 82. He was laid to rest in the Enzenbühl Cemetery in Zurich.
