= Hottingen (Zurich) =

Quarter in Zurich, Switzerland

Hottingen Hottinge Zürich-Hottingen
- Quarter
- Flag Coat of arms

- Location within Canton of Zürich Location within Switzerland
- Coordinates: 47°22′07″N 8°33′31″E
- Country: Switzerland
- Canton: Zurich
- City: Zurich
- District: District 7
- Postal code: 8032, 8044

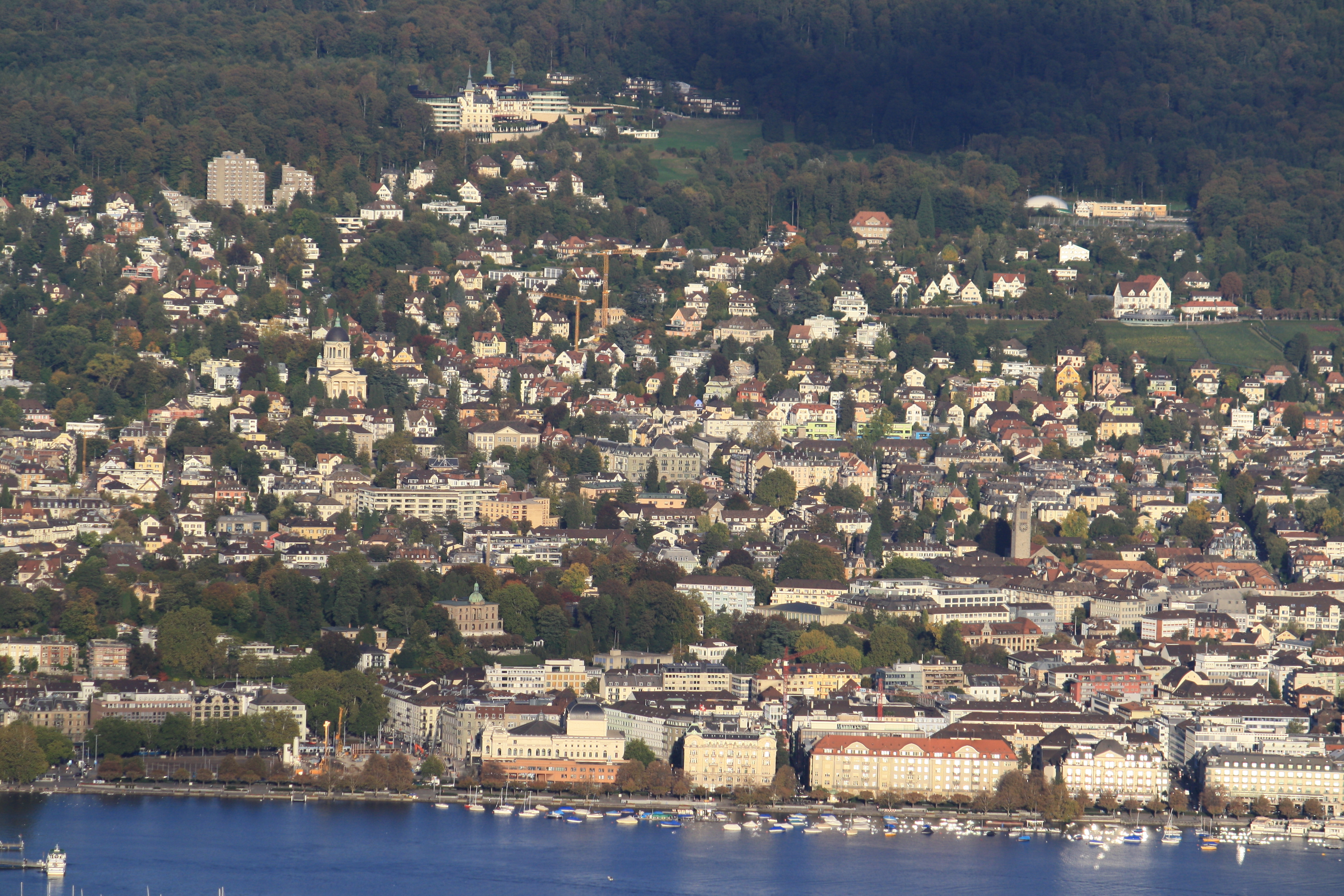
Adlisberg and Hottingen, as seen from Uetliberg, Seefeld quarter in the foreground, Grand Hotel Dolder in the background (October 2009)

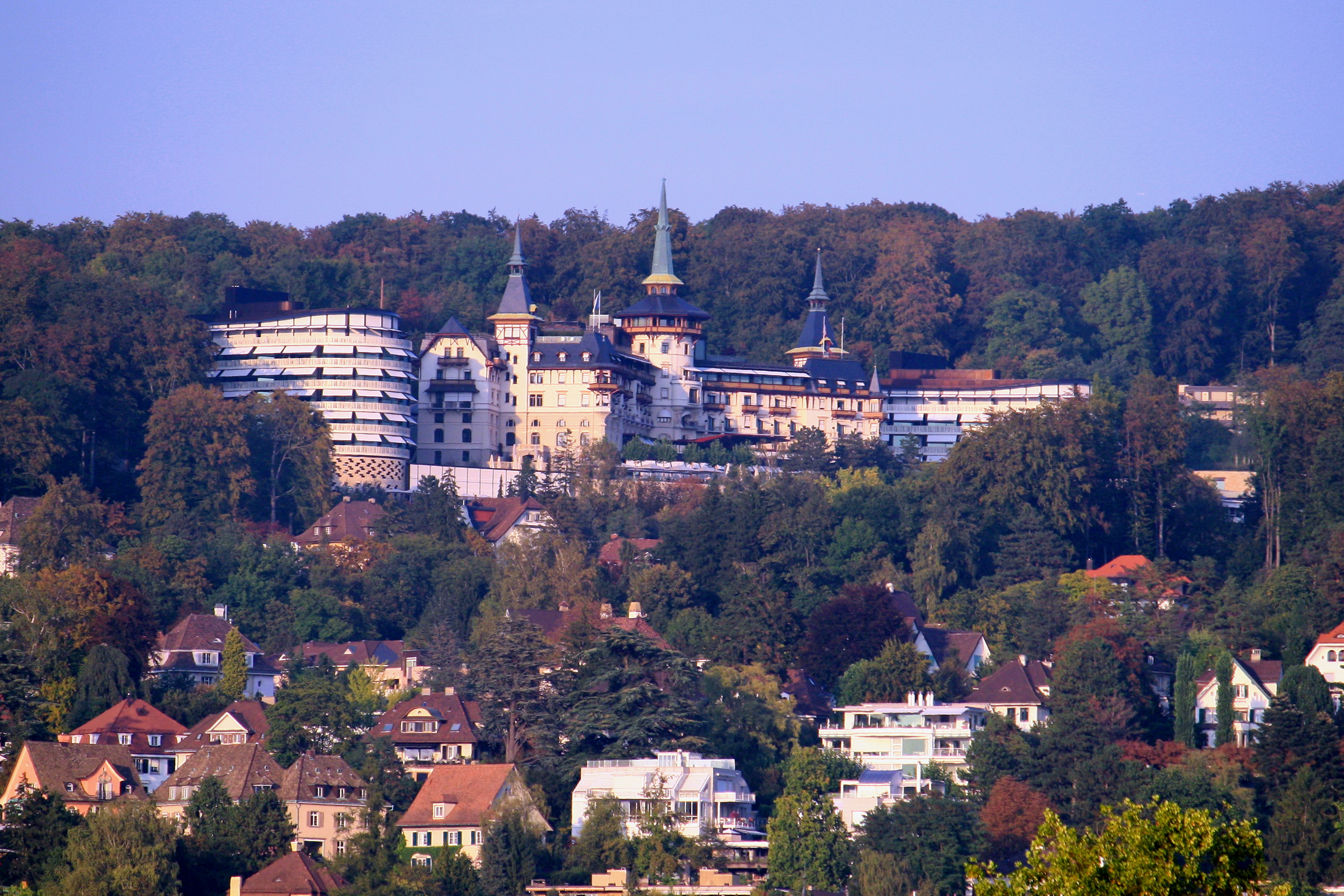
Grand Hotel Dolder and Hottingen as seen from Lake Zürich

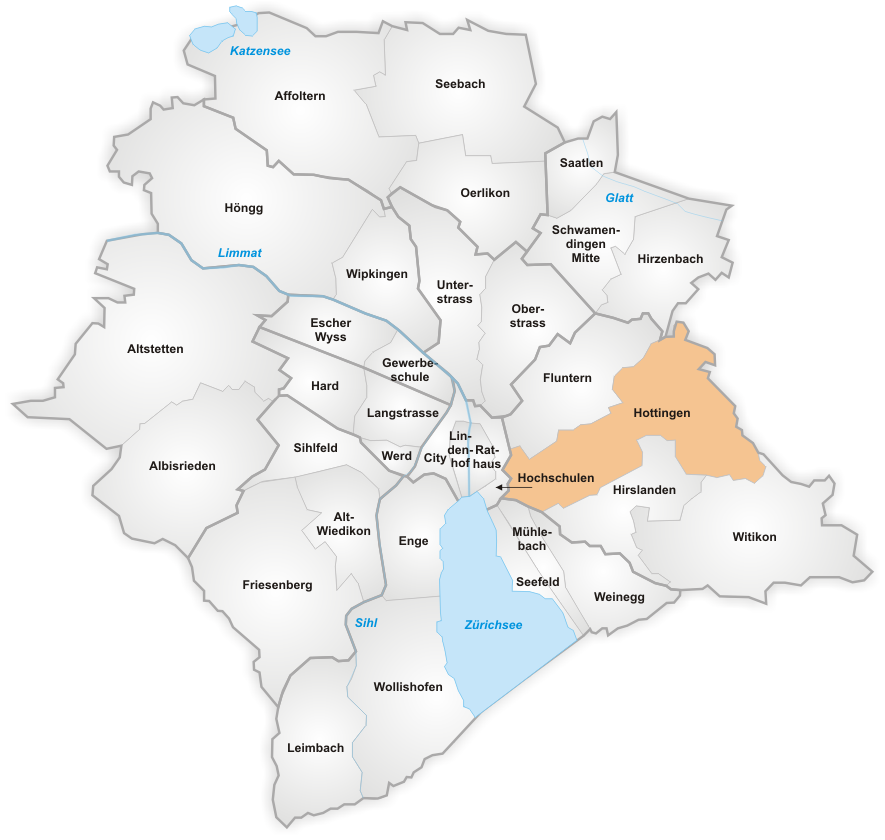
The quarter of Hottingen in Zürich.

Hottingen (Swiss Standard German: Hottinge) is a quarter in District 7 of Zurich. It was formerly a municipality of its own, but was incorporated into Zurich in 1893.

The quarter has a population of 10,100 in an area of 5.05 square kilometres (1.95 sq mi).

Hottingen is located on the southern side of the Adlisberg. The upper part of Hottingen is called Dolder and is a residential quarter of Zurich.

Points of interests include, besides Adlisberg, the Villa Tobler, its park and the Theater an der Winkelwiese.

== Notable people ==
- Hermann Bleuler (1837 – 1912), mechanical engineer
- Carl Abegg-Arter (1860–1943), textile manufacturer
- Sigismund Righini (1870–1937), painter

Aerial view (1949)
