= Villa Tobler =

Villa Tobler / Theater an der Winkelweise
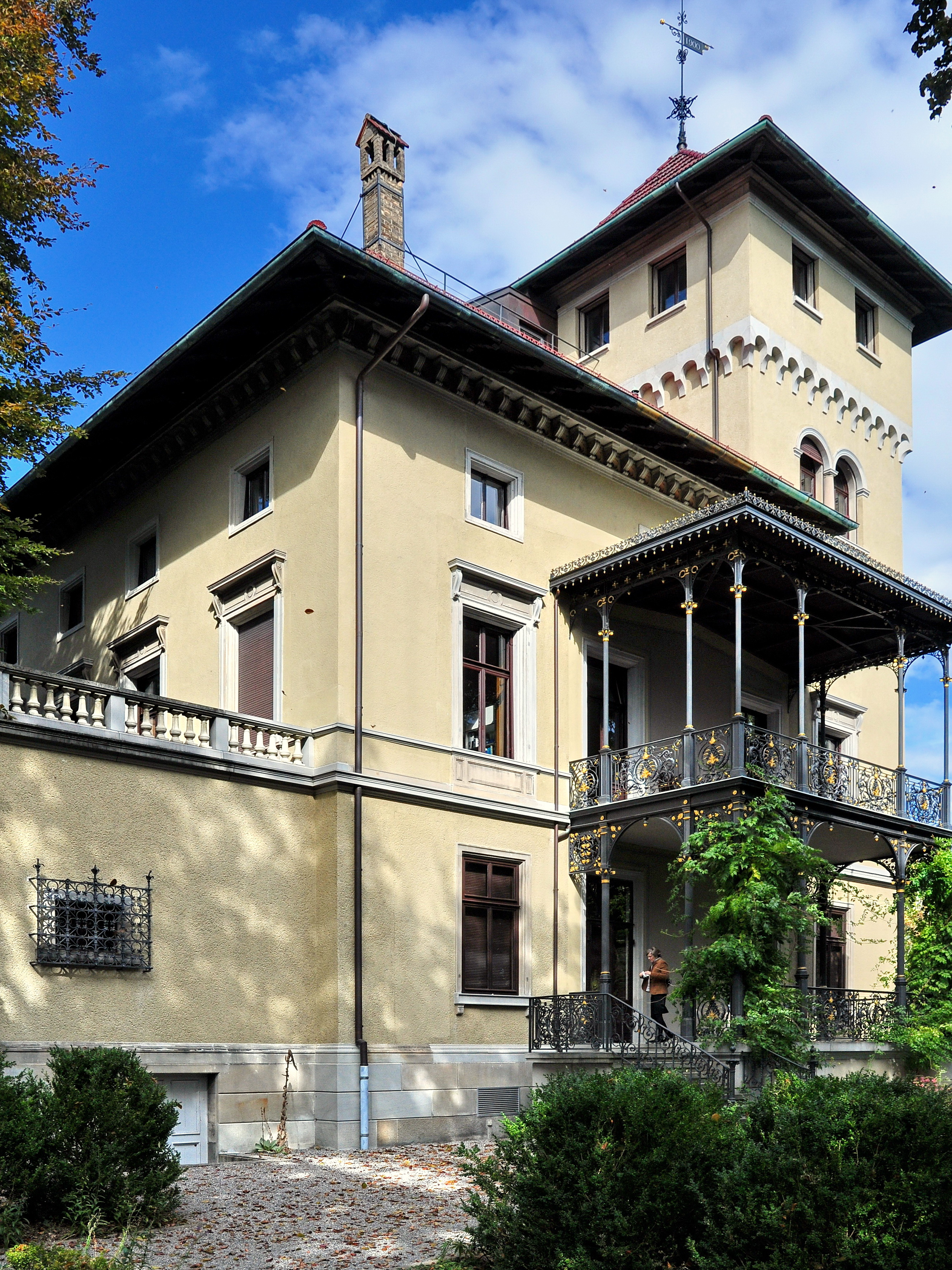
- Interactive map of the Villa Tobler / Theater an der Winkelweise area

General information
- Type: Theater, mansion and park
- Architectural style: Neoclassical architecture
- Location: Zürich-Hottingen, Canton of Zürich, Switzerland, Winkelwiese 4, CH-8001 Zürich
- Coordinates: 47°22′12.59″N 8°32′47.98″E
- Construction started: 1853
- Completed: 1853
- Owner: City of Zürich

Technical details
- Floor count: 3

Design and construction
- Architects: Gustav Wegmann (1853); Hans Heinrich Conrad von Muralt, exterior, and Eduard Berlepsch-Valendas, interior (1900); Jakob Zweifel (1964, basement rebuilt to house the theater)

Villa Tober, also known as the Theater an der Winkelwiese, is a protected building in Zürich-Hottingen that comprises the mansion built in 1853, and a public park.

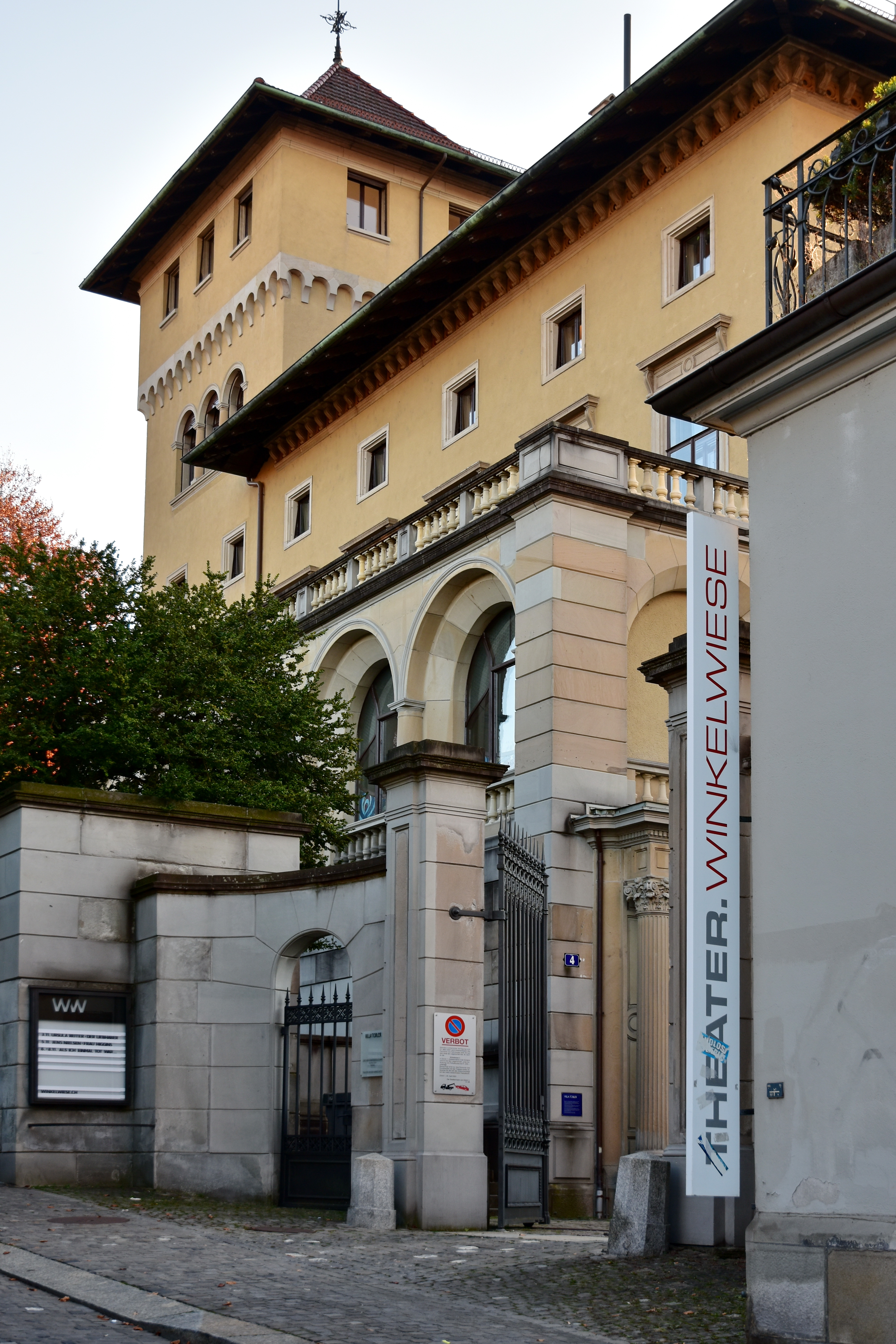

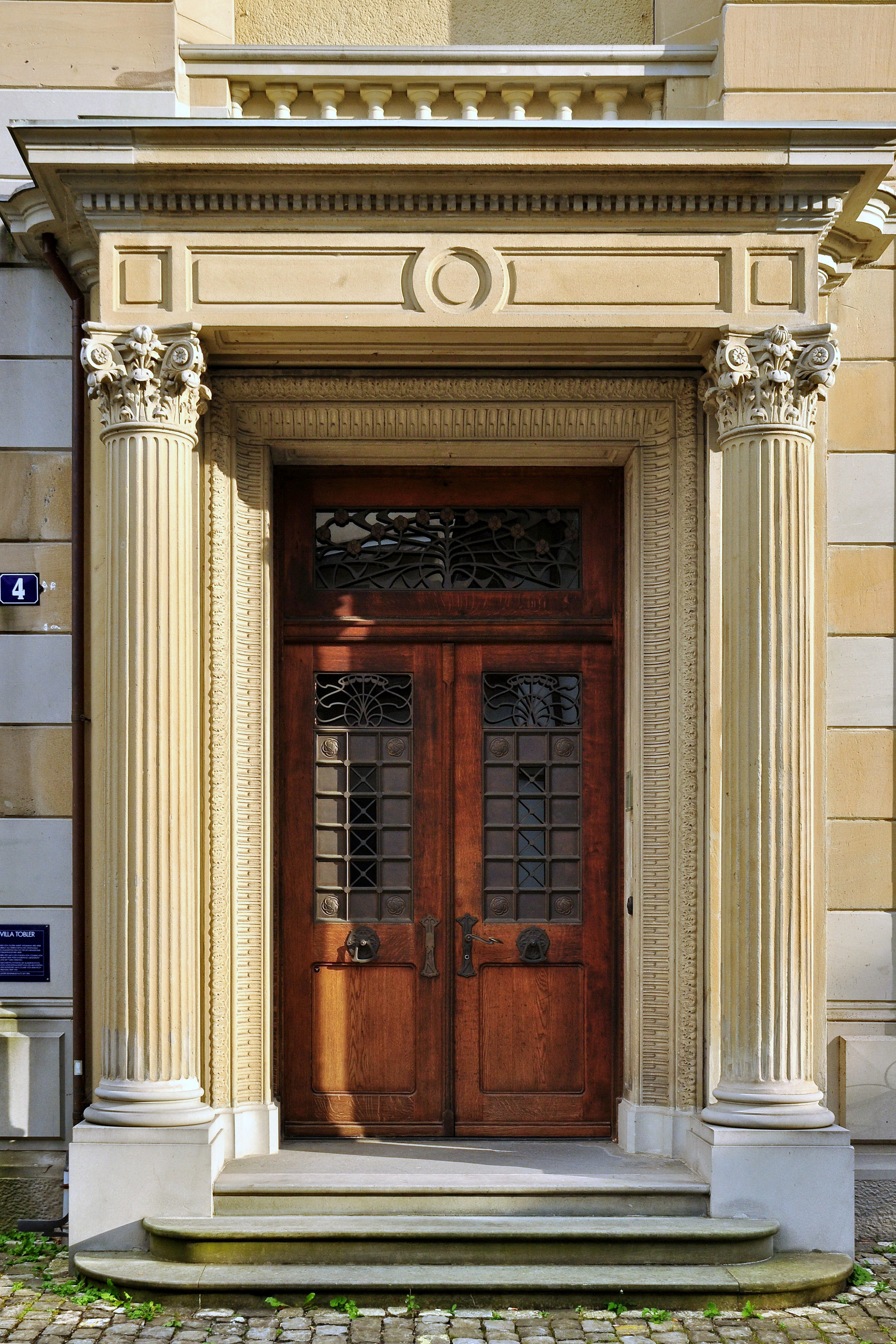

== Location ==
The villa (or theater) is situated in Zürich-Hottingen, between Kunsthaus Zürich and Forchplatz in Zürich-Weinegg. The area houses also the public park, and the Theater an der Winkelwiese in the basement. Public transport is provided by the Zürich Tram routes 3, 5, 8 and 9 (Kunsthaus) and by the bus line 31 (Winkelwiese).

== Villa Tobler ==
On behalf of the bank manager Jakob Emil Tobler-Finsler and his son Gustav Adolf Tobler-Blumer, the Swiss architect Gustav Albert Wegmann built the mansion at Winkelwiese in the late Classicist style in 1853. Wegmann's major works include the Bahnhofstrasse and the greenhouse of the Old Botanical Garden, Zürich. In 1900 a far-reaching reconstruction of the house was carried out by Hans Heinrich Conrad von Muralt, and the interior was designed by Hans Eduard von Berlepsch-Valendas. Today the sumptuous Art Nouveau interior is one of the nicest in Zürich. One of the first landscape gardens in Zürich is an essential part of the mansion, with its typical winding paths and the surrounding walls. New jewelry items came into the garden when it was rebuilt around 1900: noteworthy are the dragon fountain (Drachenbrunnen) with the gold-colored mosaic round fontaine basin, and the youth figure (Jünglingsfigur) by Richard Kissling, under the pergola next to the fountain. In 1913 the Mertens brothers modernized the southern garden in the then new architectural style whose characteristic elements are straight ways, cut hedges and the rhythm between open, colored flower beds and shady, green areas. When the property was sold to a general contractor in 1951, the squalor and savagery of the gardens began. The demolition and the planned development of the land in the early 1960s, suggested a large public opposition. That's why, in 1964, the property was acquired by the city of Zürich. The villa was subsequently used by the Theater an der Winkelwiese and by the acting academy, and several rooms were loaned to artists. Since 1979 the garden is open to the public. In 1983 a playground has been set up at the request of the Hottingen district. There, fortunately, the garden architecture was not interrupted by the fountain, but only showered and covered with cement slabs.

In 1996 the Villa Tobler was leased by the city of Zürich in construction law to the Zürcher Kunstgesellschaft, the sponsorship of the Kunsthaus which bore the costs of the renovation. Later, the house passed to the Kunsthaus Zürich in charge of the Stiftung Zürcher Kunsthaus, and to the theater was guaranteed a ten-year lease. The mansion was renewed in 1996, and between 1998 and 2000. The redesign of the garden took place according to historic preservation aspects while preserving the historic substance. At the request of the population, a play area for children has been re-integrated into the garden.

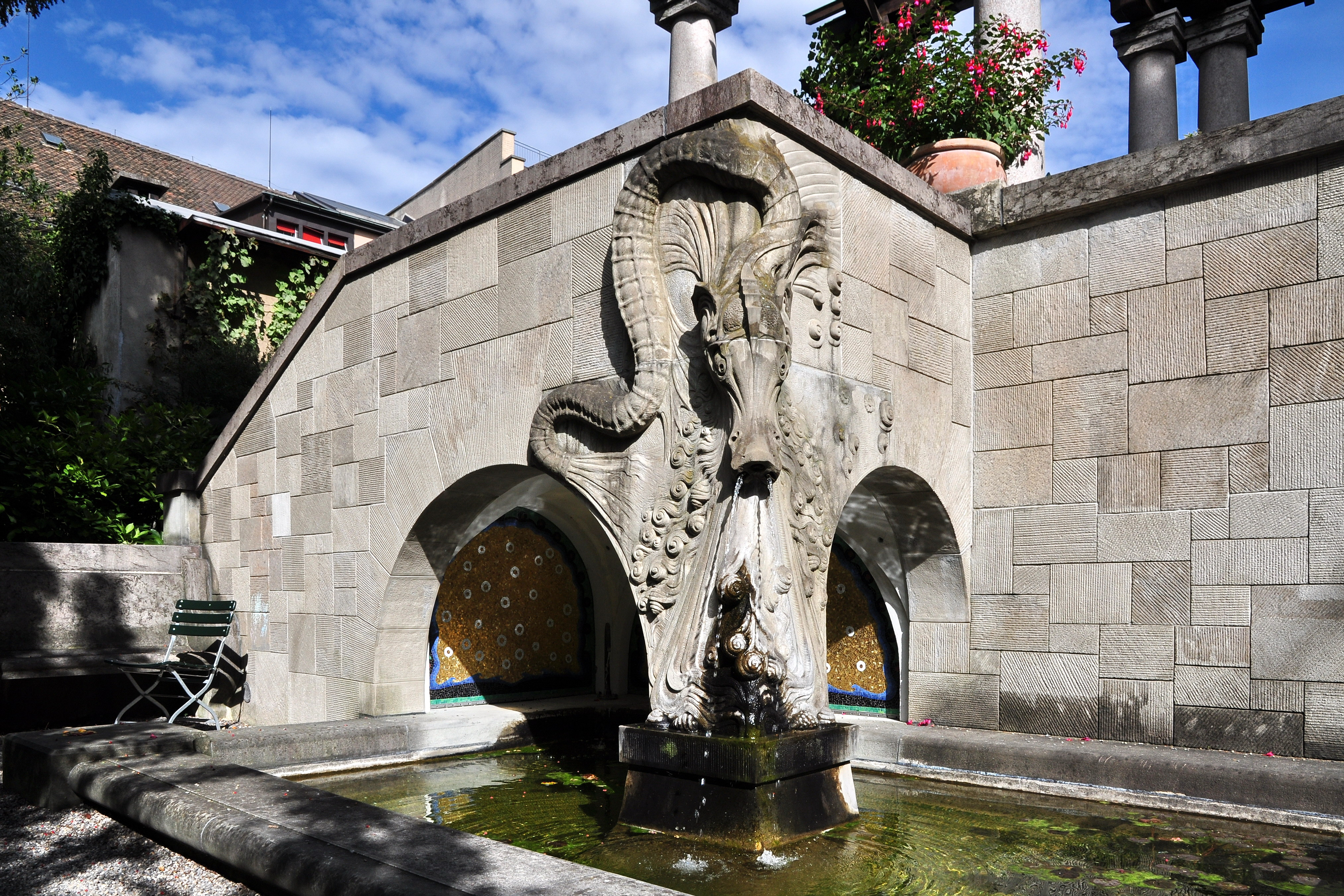
Drachenbrunnen

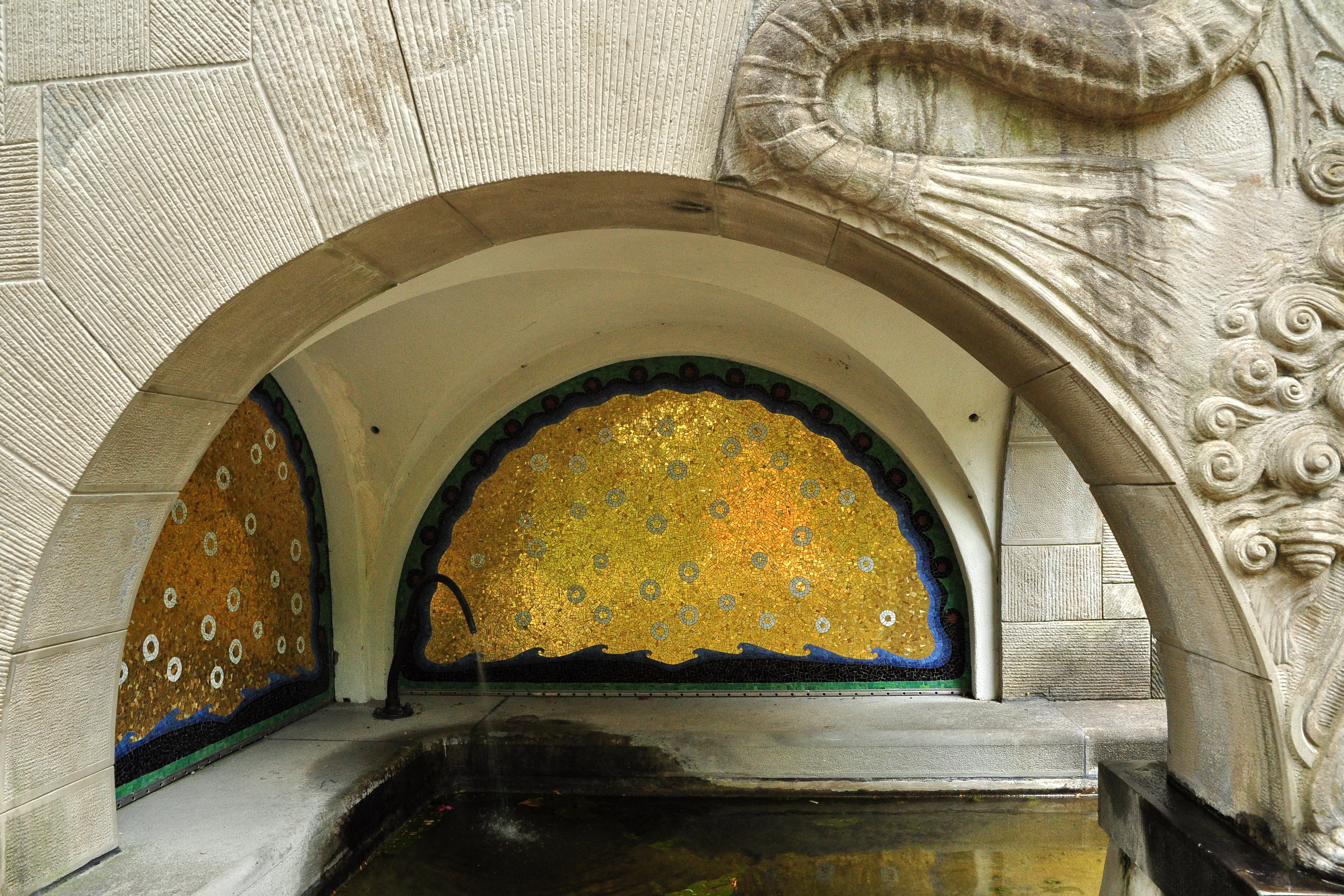

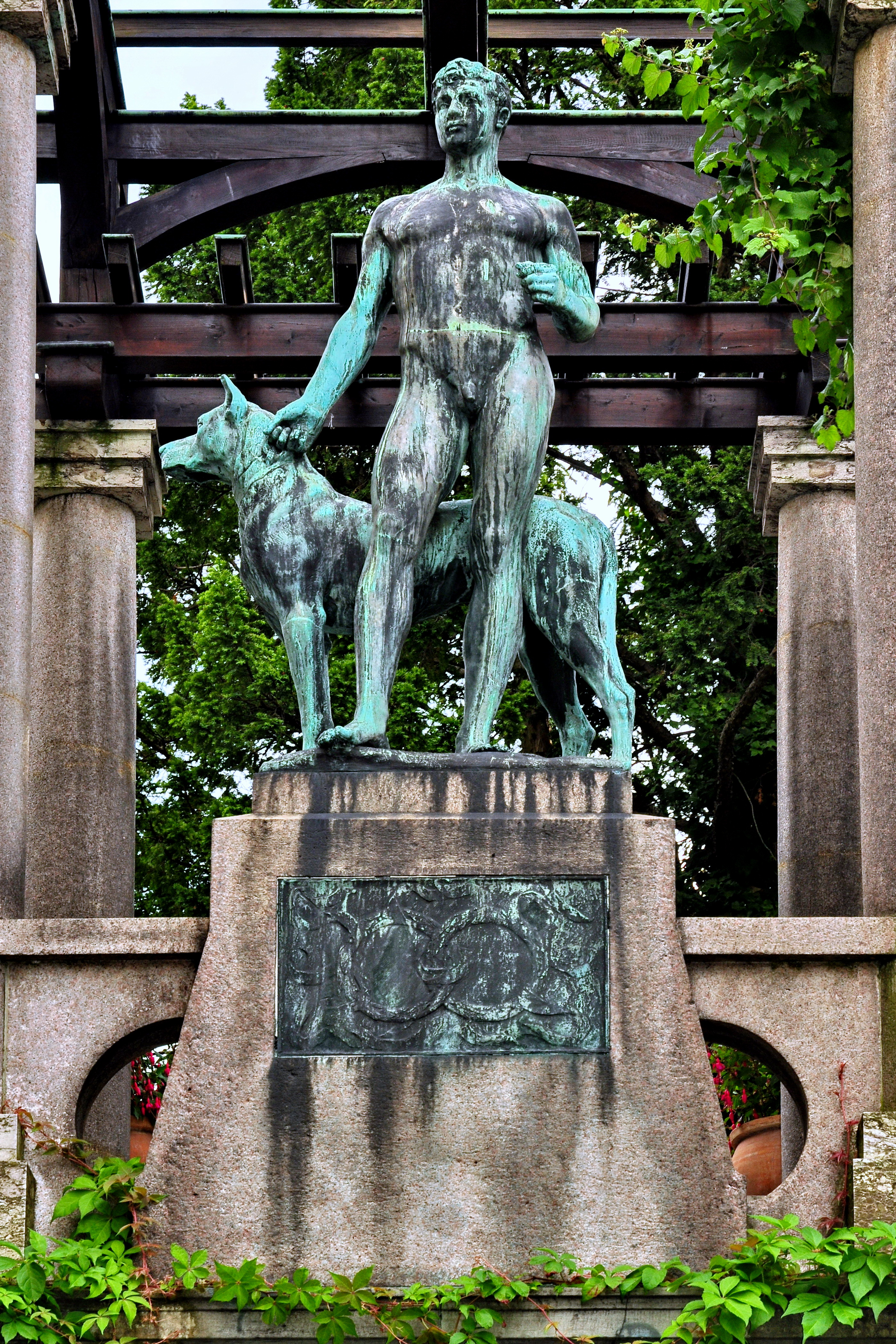
Jünglingsfigur

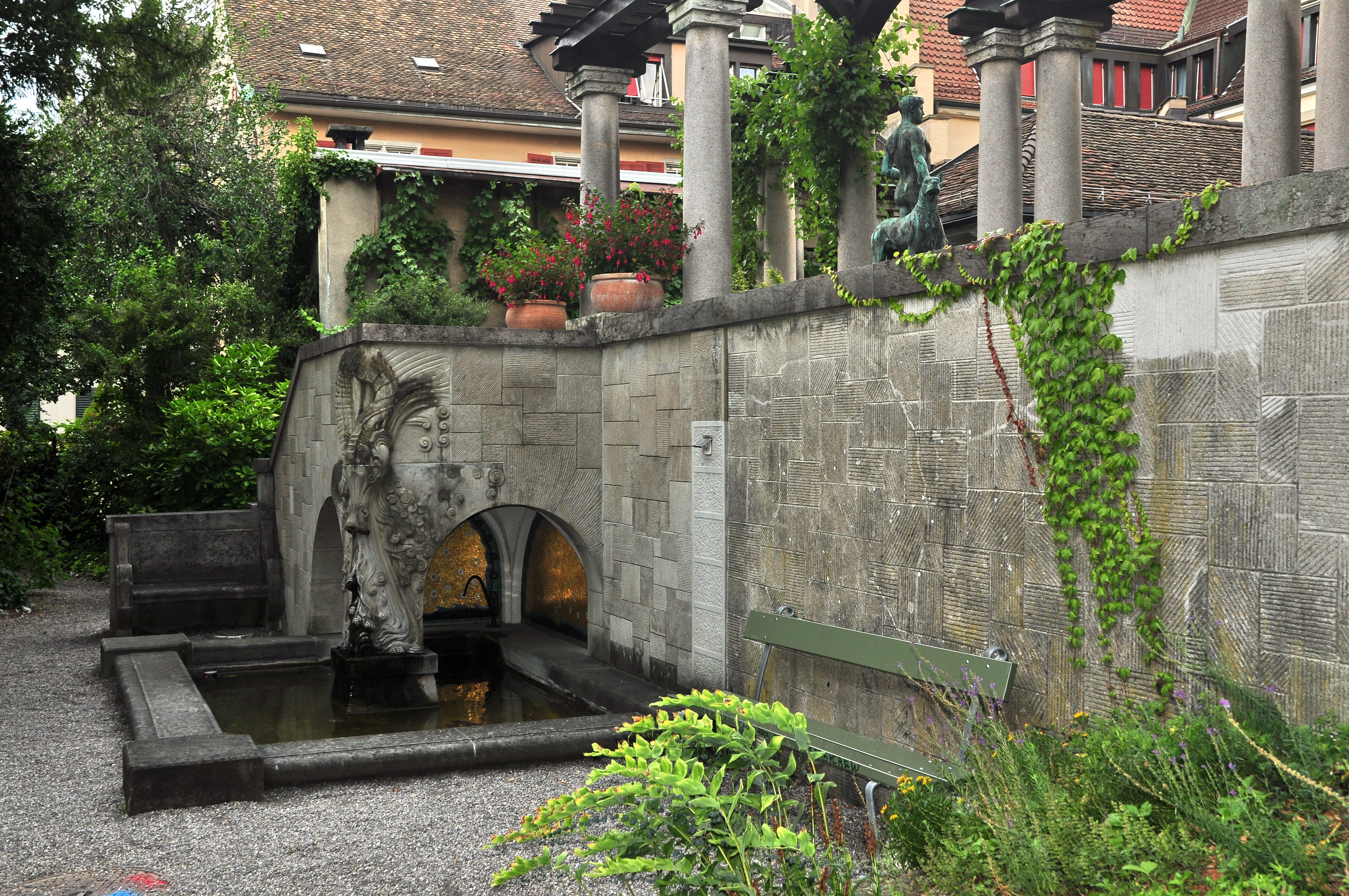

== Theater an der Winkelwiese ==
On 16 June 1964 Maria von Ostfelden, an actress and then the director, opened with Pinter's "Der Hausmeister" the theater as a venue for her directorial work. She was supported by Jakob Zweifel, an architect that modified the building's basement to house the theater. Up to a hundred times a year, productions of mainly avant-garde authors (Arrabal, Ionesco, Albee, Triana) were played, and made the small theater to a stage for modern, experimental theater. After Ostfelden's death in 1971, the operation continued and went over, in different constellations, to actresses and actors and directors who were related to the theater. During these years, the playhouse developed to a contemporary and socially critical aligned experimental theater with a thematically and artistically wide range of 20th-century plays, for example, works by Bertolt Brecht, Samuel Beckett and Rainer Werner Fassbinder, Dario Fo and Alfred Jarry, and premieres and special events (guest performances, readings, jazz concerts). Starting in 1994 according to a new organizational model, mainly co-productions with independent groups and theaters of similar orientation were carried out. Together with other stakeholders, a support program for young Swiss playwrights and dramatists was initiated in 2000 called "Dramenprozessor". In more than twenty years of its existence, the training, which is accompanied by practitioners and authors, has proven to be an efficient "processor" for contemporary playwrights at the beginning of their careers. In 2015 the "Dramenprozessor" was awarded the Theaterpreis of the Federal Office of Culture.

In 2003, director Stephan Roppel took over the lead of Theater Winkelwiese and made a significant contribution to deepening and consolidating the theater as a center of excellence for contemporary auteur theater. From 2015 to 2022 director and actor Manuel Bürgin was responsible for Theater Winkelwiese and played a key role in connecting the theater more closely with independent and municipal theaters in Switzerland. He expanded the collaboration with local and national theater groups from the independent scene, making the theater an increasingly popular co-producer and guest performance venue. Since August 2022, cultural manager and director Hannah Steffen has been the new director of Theater Winkelwiese. Under her direction, the focus on auteur theater is being sharpened again. She is also increasingly committed to establishing a sustainable and climate-neutral theater practice at Winkelwiese in the coming years,

Since 1970 the theater receives an annual subsidy by the government of the city of Zürich, and in addition, an annual subsidy by the Canton of Zürich since 1989. Since 1988 an association is the legal bearer, and its board of directors, which also houses a municipal representative, selects the directorate which is autonomous in the context of the performance contract with the city of Zürich.

== Cultural heritage of national importance ==
The area of the park and the mansion and associated theater are listed in the Swiss inventory of cultural property of national and regional significance as a Class A object of national importance. The associated buildings, the former stables and the greenhouse, are not publicly accessible.

== Literature ==
- Silvia Markun: Maria von Ostfelden. Theater als Experiment. Lars Müller, Baden 1996, ISBN 3-907044-15-0
- Gartenbiografien: Orte erzählen. vdf Hochschulverlag AG, ETH Zürich, Zürich 2013, ISBN 978-3728135797.
