= Hermann Bleuler =

Swiss engineer and artillery officer

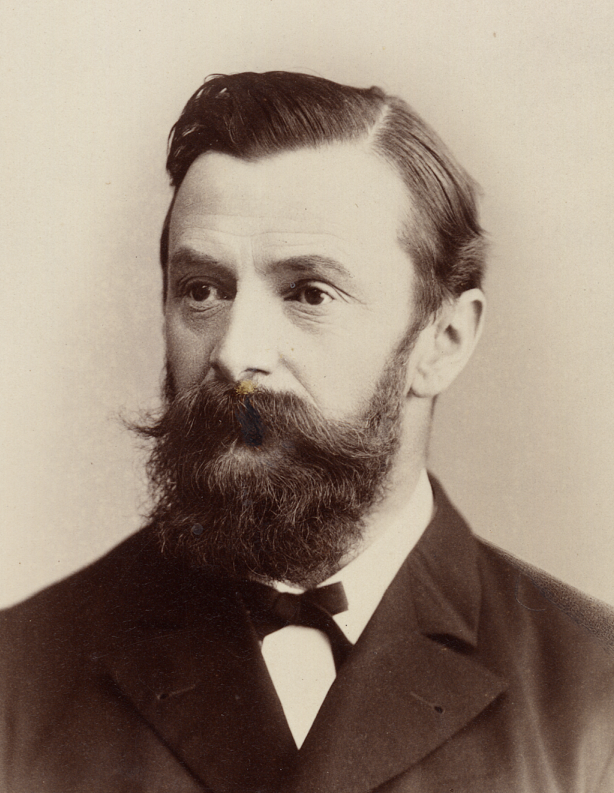
Hermann Bleuler, ca. 1886

Hermann Bleuler (22 November 1837, Hottingen, Zürich – 7 February 1912, Zürich) was a Swiss engineer and artillery officer in the Swiss army.

After attending the Gymnasium and Industrieschule in Zürich, Bleuler studied from 1855 to 1858 at the Zürich Polytechnikum with Diplom in civil engineering in 1858 (as a member of the first graduating class). He was from 1858 to 1861 an engineer at the Bell Maschinenfabrik AG Kriens, resigning in 1861 to join the Swiss army. He was from 1862 to 1870 the chief of the Federal Artillery Bureau in Aarau and from 1870 to 1888 the chief instructor (Oberinstruktor) of artillery. Bleuler was promoted to Hauptmann (captain) in 1864, to Major in 1868, to Oberstleutnant (lieutenant colonel) in 1869, and to Oberst (colonel) in 1871. He invented a significantly improved field howitzer. From 1891 to 1904 he was the Kommandant of the 3rd Army Corps and member of the Landesverteidigungskommission (National Defense Commission).

Bleuler was a member from 1881 to 1907 of the Swiss Schulrat (Federal School Board), serving as its president from 1888 to 1905. As president, he supported the construction of engineering laboratories at the Zürich Polytechnikum and the improvement of the quality of the teaching staff there. He was one of the organizers of the first International Congress of Mathematicians, which was held in Geneva in 1897.

== Villa Bleuler ==
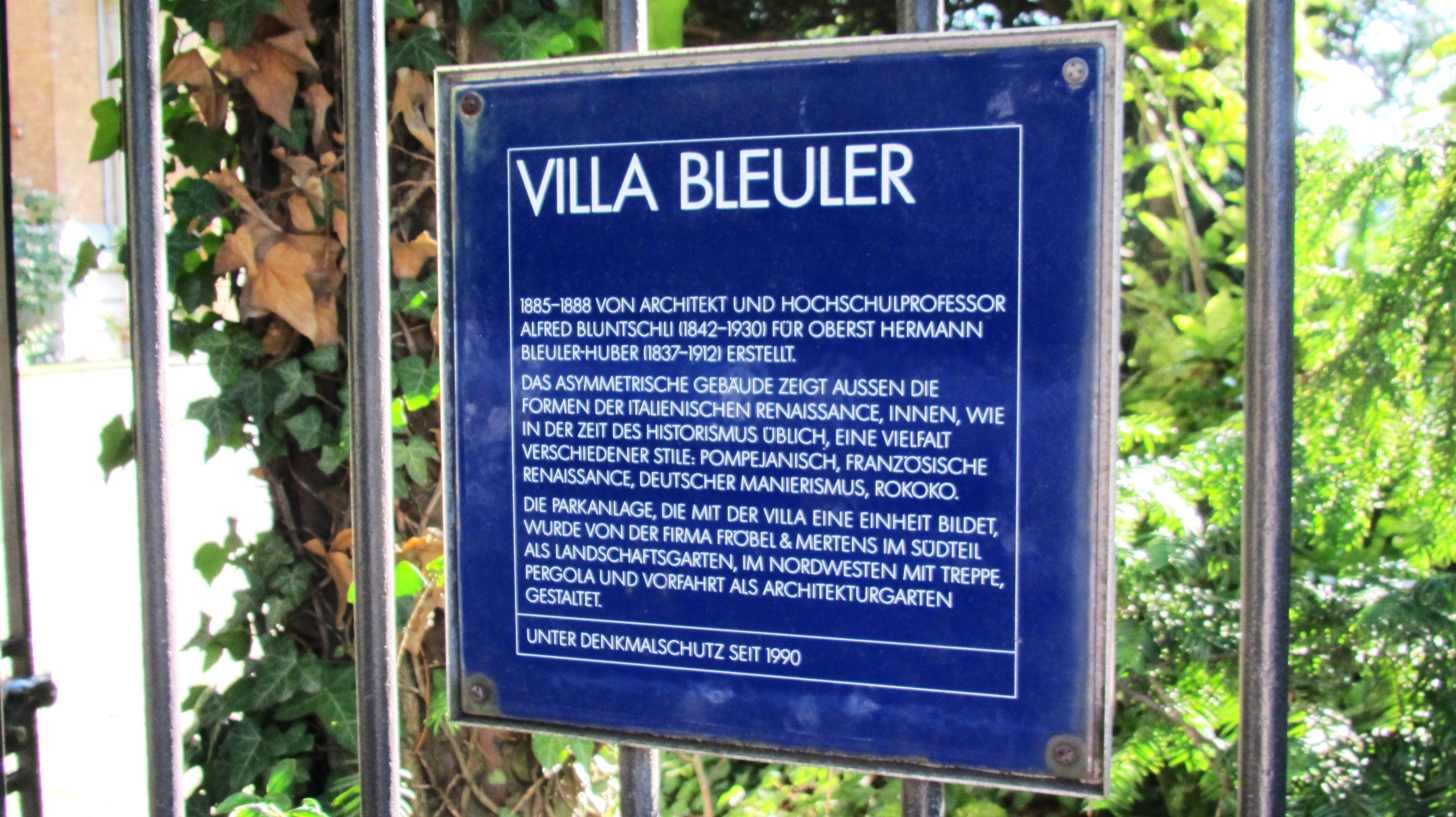
Zollikerstrasse 32 Zürich

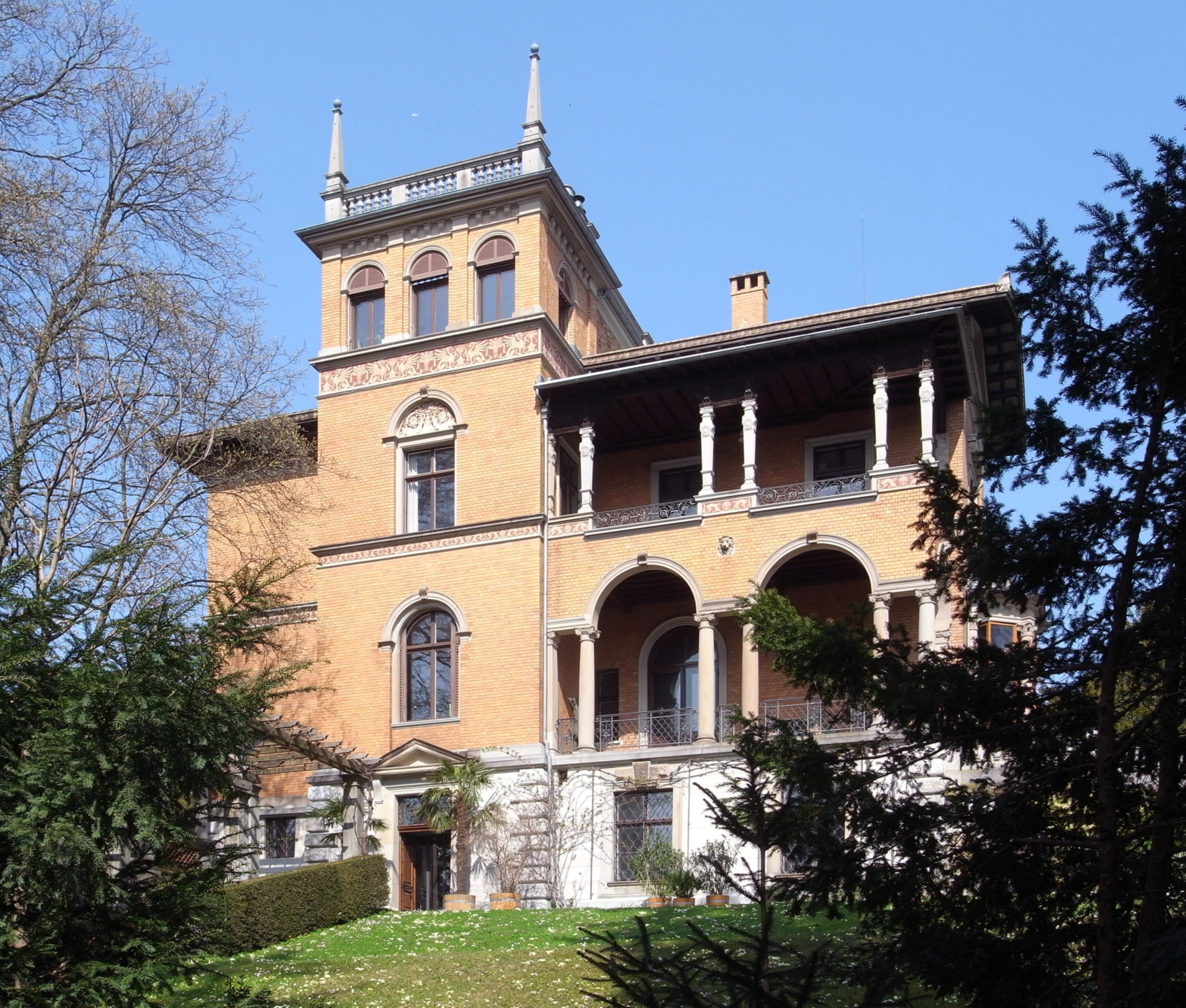
Villa Bleuler

In 1887, Bleuler with his wife and son moved into a new house, the "Villa Bleuler", which was built for them. Today the building houses the Schweizerisches Institut für Kunstwissenschaft SIK-ISEA (Swiss Institute for Art Research), a competence centre for art scholarship and art technology, founded in 1951. The building, constructed by the architect Alfred Friedrich Bluntschli, has been since 1990 under Swiss federal protection as a historical landmark.
