= Gustav Hausmann =

German painter

- Born: 23 July 1827; Göttingen
- Died: 13 April 1899 (aged 71); Hanover
- Known for: Landscape painting

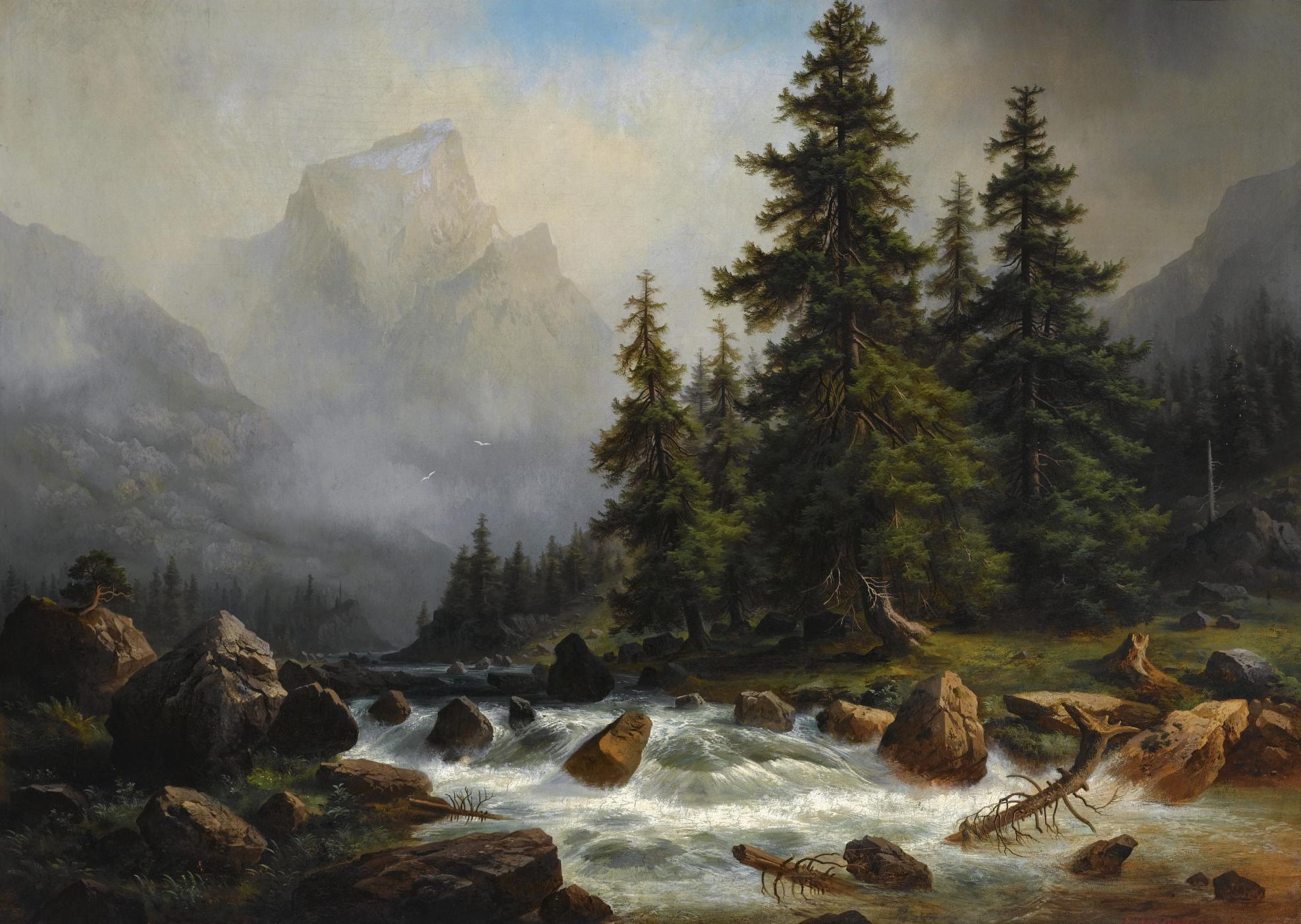
View of the Wetterhorn

Gustav Hausmann (23 July 1827, Göttingen - 13 April 1899, Hanover) was a German painter; primarily of mountain landscapes.

== Biography ==
Born in a small village, he attended the gymnasium in Goslar, where his talent for painting was first noticed. This resulted in a scholarship, mediated by the Hannoverscher Künstlerverein and awarded by Crown Prince George (later King George V). This enabled him to study landscape painting under Edmund Koken at the Polytechnischen Schule in Hannover. He was there from 1845 to 1850. After that, he went to Munich where he was a student of Albert Zimmermann, Christian Morgenstern and August Seidel

In 1856 he returned to Hanover, joined the Hannoverscher Künstlerverein and soon became one of that city's most prominent painters.

From 1862 to 1865, he was employed as an art teacher for the Hanoverian princesses, Frederica und Marie. Even after the family had fled to Austria, in 1866, when Hanover was annexed by the Kingdom of Prussia, he continued to receive commissions from the princesses' mother, Queen Marie.

During those years he lived in seclusion, but continued to paint landscapes of the Bavarian Alps and Harz Mountains. By 1874, he was able to buy his own home. Following his death, the Hannoverscher Künstlerverein held a memorial exhibition, consisting of over 150 oil sketches.

His youngest daughter, Lisa, married Hermann Löns, a journalist and author known as the "Poet of the Heath".

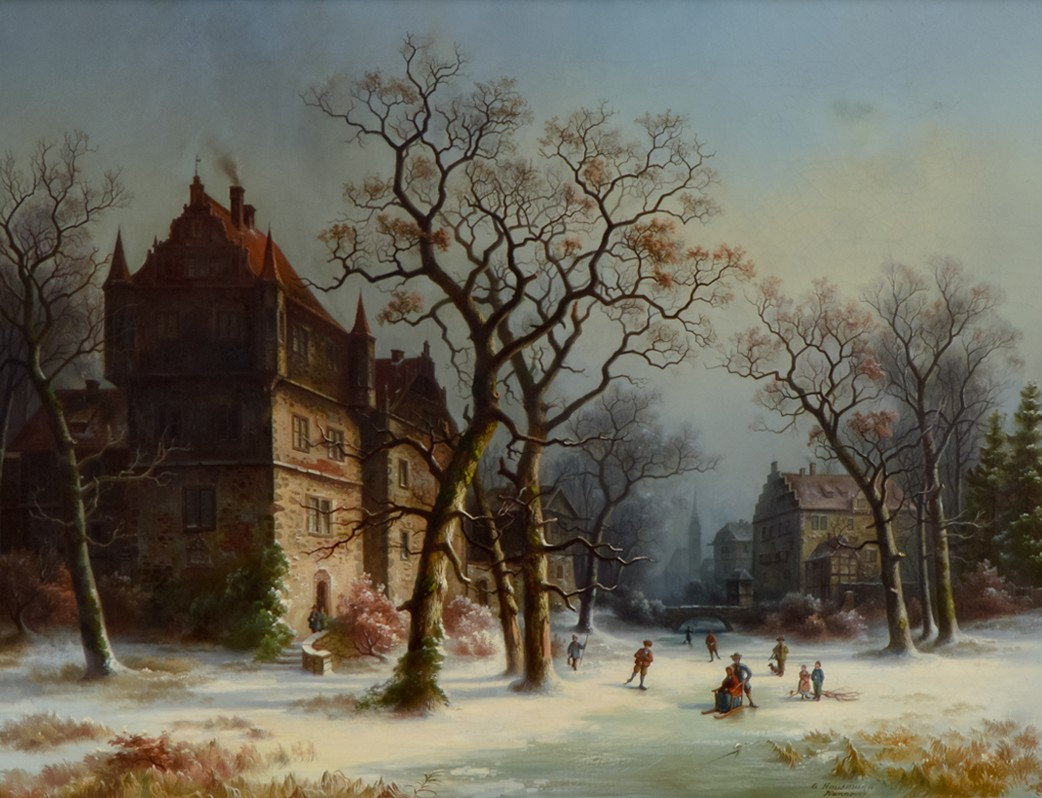
Ice Skating
