= Gustav Koken =

German painter (1850–1910)

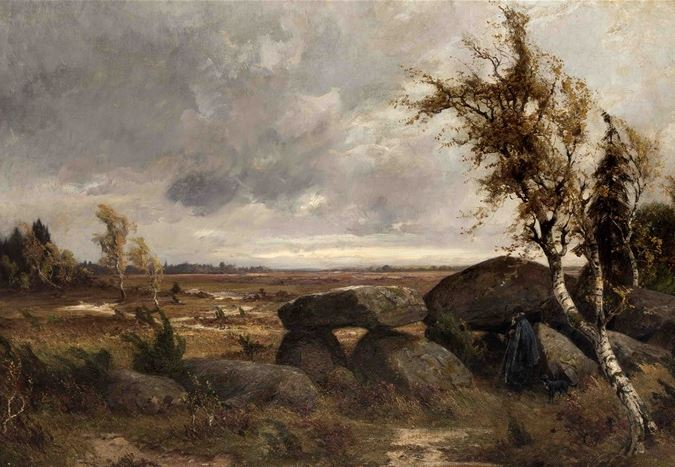
Heathland with Shepherd

Gustav Heinrich Julius Koken (8 August 1850, Hanover - 6 July 1910, Hanover) was a German painter and etcher. He was the nephew of Edmund Koken, a landscape painter, and the father of Änne Koken, a graphic designer.

== Biography ==
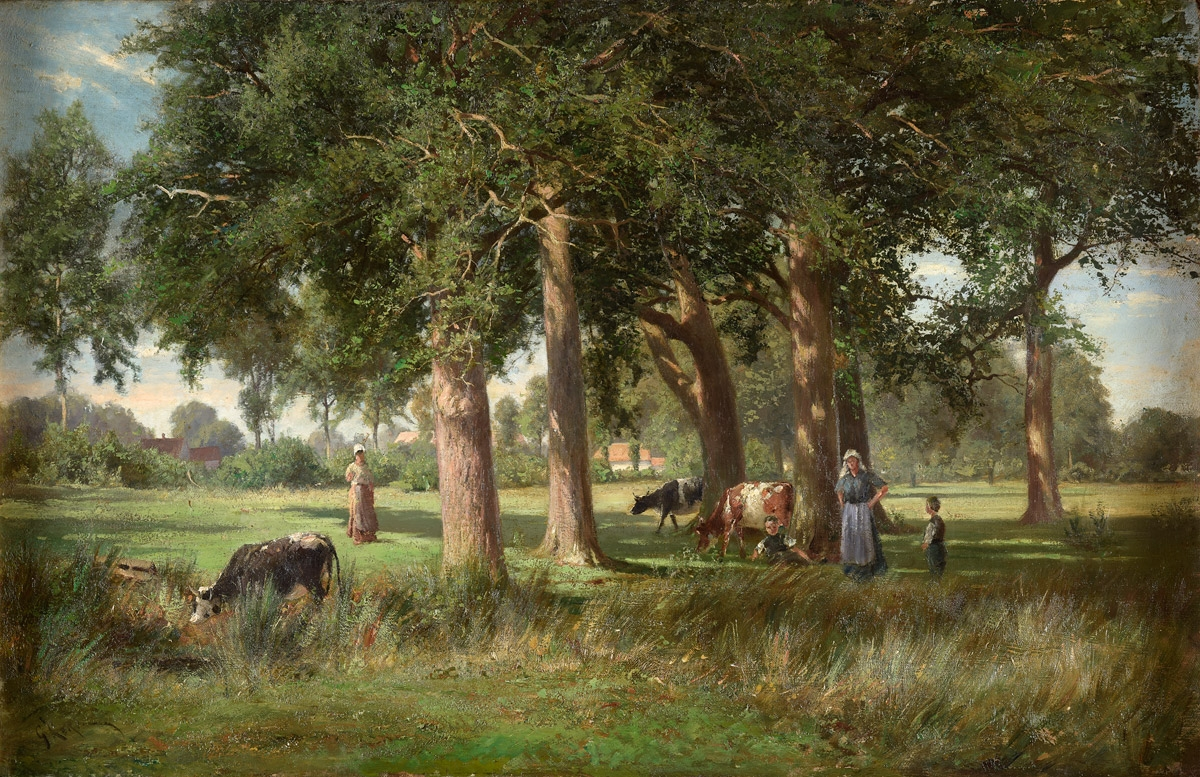
A Shady Spot

He was initially given art lessons by his uncle Edmund. After leaving Hanover for a time, to tour Germany, he enrolled at the Grand-Ducal Saxon Art School, Weimar in 1872. His primary instructor there was Theodor Hagen. In addition to painting, he studied etching and had his own studio in Weimar until 1878.

That year, he returned to Hanover, where he became a member of the Hannoverscher Künstlerverein. Immediately after, he began a campaign for the creation of new galleries and a reorganization of the exhibition system. He was also involved in establishing an art museum at the Leibniz House.

In order to gain further inspiration, he travelled frequently; visiting Emsland, the Teutoburg Forest, the Lüneburg Heath and the Südheide (now a nature park). During this time, he was offered a professorship at the Kunstakademie Königsberg, but he declined because he wanted to remain in his homeland. Instead, he founded a private painting school in Hanover.

He was a good friend of the opera singer, Georg Nollet, who would often perform in his home. Together with the painters Hermann Schaper, Oscar Wichtendahl and Ernst Pasqual Jordan, he decorated the singer's home, known as the "Salle Nollet".

One month before his sixtieth birthday, he died suddenly from a heart attack. Following his death, a special exhibition was held. In 2004, the Historisches Museum Hannover presented a retrospective of works by every member of the Koken family.
