= Hans Eduard von Berlepsch-Valendas =

Swiss artist (1849–1921)

Hans Karl Eduard von Berlepsch-Valendas
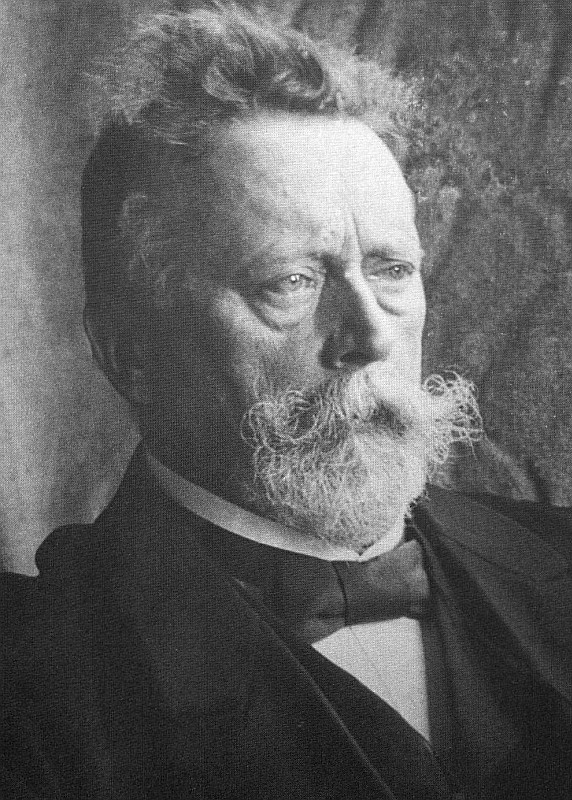
- Hans Eduard von Berlepsch-Valendas (c.1910)
- Born: 31 December 1849; St. Gallen, Switzerland
- Died: 17 August 1921 (aged 71); Munich, Germany
- Education: Gottfried Semper, Academy of Fine Arts, Munich
- Known for: Architecture, Design, Writing, Painting
- Notable work: Villa Tobler (Zürich), Villa Berlepsch (Planegg)
- Movement: Art Nouveau

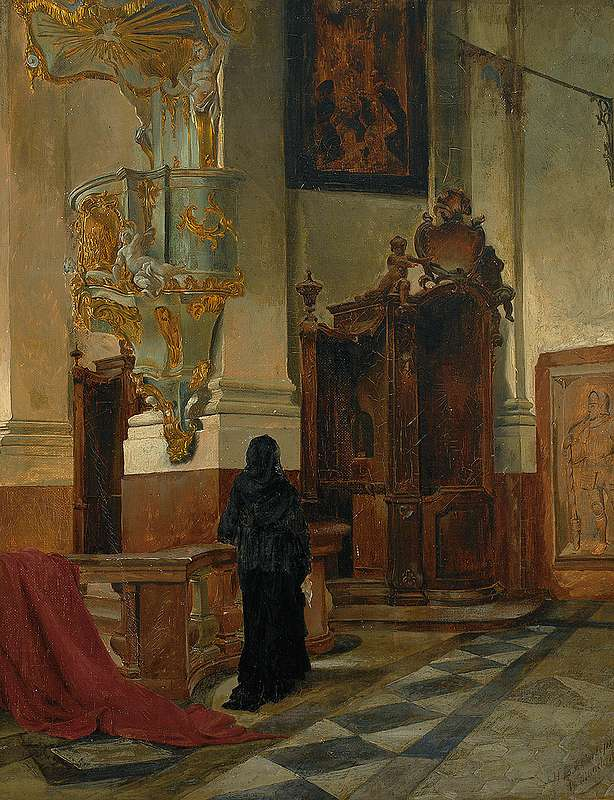
Baroque Church Interior (1882)

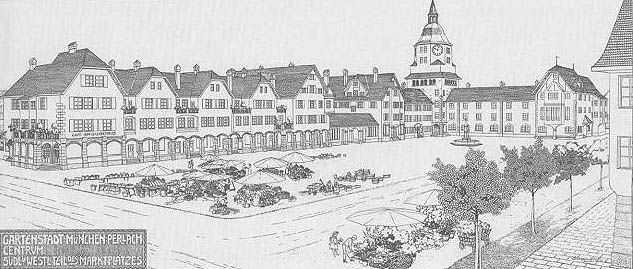
Design for the "Gardenstadt" in Ramersdorf-Perlach

Hans Karl Eduard von Berlepsch-Valendas (31 December 1849, St. Gallen – 17 August 1921, Munich) was a Swiss architect, designer, writer and painter.

== Biography ==
His father, Hermann Alexander (1813–1883) was a liberal bookseller and writer who had come to Switzerland from Göttingen during the German Revolutions. He was a student of the architect Gottfried Semper from 1868 to 1871. After 1872, on his father's advice, he was employed at several business enterprises. He later studied painting in Frankfurt and the Academy of Fine Arts, Munich.

After a short stint as a battle painter for the Russians in Bulgaria during the Russo-Turkish War, he worked as an architect, interior designer and craft designer in Munich; working in the Art Nouveau style. Notable examples are at the Villa Tobler in Zürich, and (for his family) the Villa Berlepsch in Planegg near Munich). He also designed interiors for two cruise ships that serviced the Bodensee. He was heavily influenced by the English Garden City movement and maintained professional contacts with Charles Rennie Mackintosh, Raymond Unwin and Charles Robert Ashbee.

In 1902, to distinguish himself from the many other Berlepsches and honor his father, who had originally taken refuge in Valendas, a city in Graubünden, he added that city's name to his own.

In 1910, he put forward some communitarian designs for workers' housing and temporary settlements at a development in Ramersdorf-Perlach. At his estate in Planegg, he established a "Schule für Malerei und Dekorative Kunst" (School for painting and decorative art). The painter, illustrator and designer, Änne Koken, was one of his best known students.

His sister, Maria Goswina von Berlepsch, was a popular writer and publisher.

== Writings ==
- Bauernhaus und Arbeiterwohnung in England. Eine Reisestudie. Stuttgart 1907.
- Die Garten-Stadt München-Perlach. München 1910.
- Die Gartenstadtbewegung in England, ihre Entwickelung und ihr jetziger Stand. R. Oldenbourg, München 1912. (online @ the Internet Archive)
- Motive der deutschen Architektur des XVI., XVII. und XVIII. Jahrhunderts in historischer Anordnung. Engelhorn, Stuttgart 1890–1893 (Digitized)
  - Vol.1: Früh- und Hochrenaissance, 1500–1650 (Digitized)
  - Vol.2: Barock und Rokoko, 1650–1800 (Digitized)
