= Alfred Friedrich Bluntschli =

Swiss architect and educator

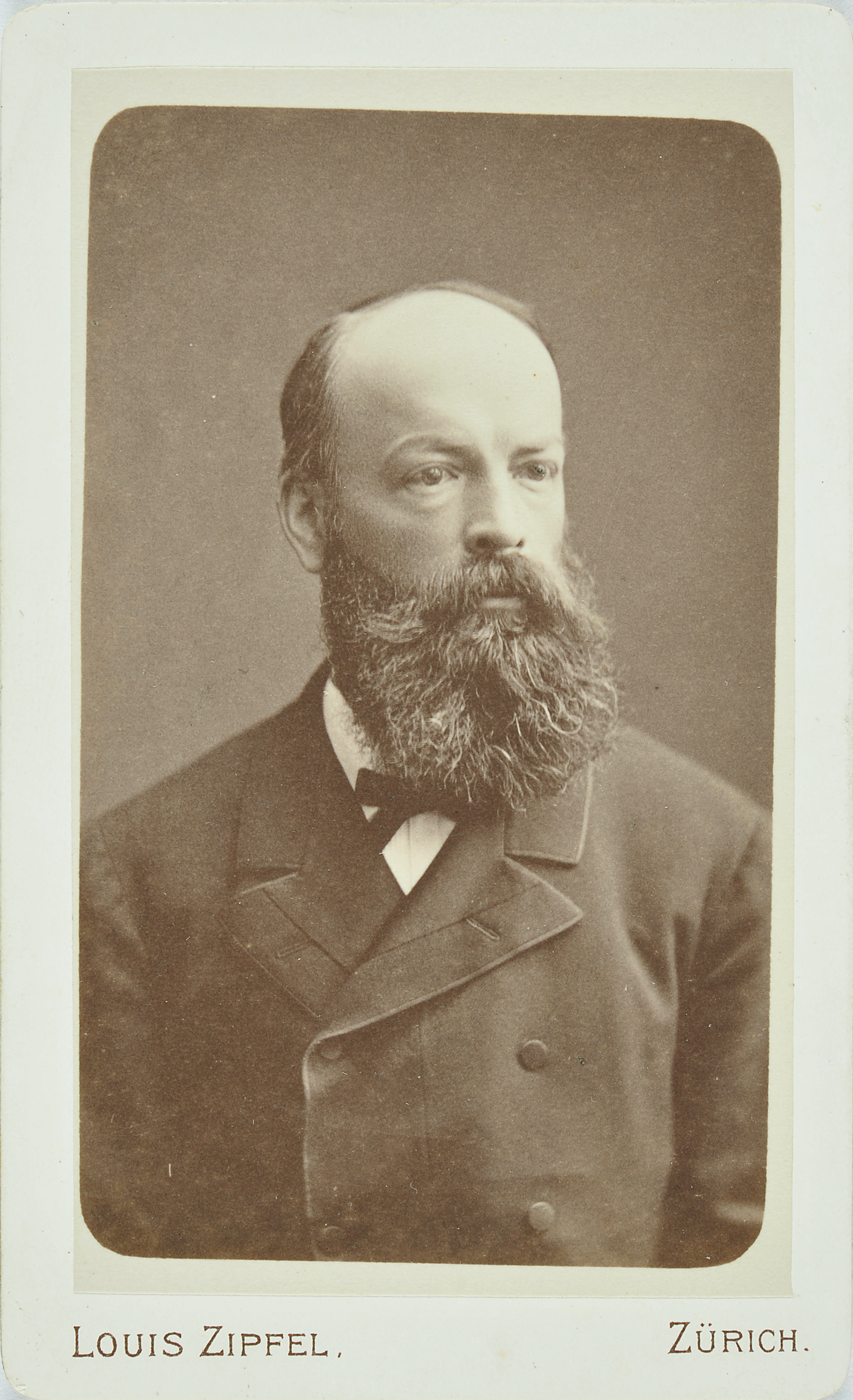
Alfred Friedrich Bluntschli (c.1886)

Alfred Friedrich Bluntschli (29 January 1842, Zürich – 27 July 1930, Zürich) was a Swiss architect and educator.

== Life and work ==
Son of a distinguished legal scholar, Johann Caspar Bluntschli, A. F. "Fritz" Bluntschli commenced his architectural education in 1860 at the Zürich Polytechnikum (now ETH Zurich) under Gottfried Semper, and later (1864) attended the École des Beaux-Arts in Paris in the atelier of Charles-Auguste Questel. By 1866, Bluntschli was shuttling between Heidelberg and Konstanz, and in 1870 he settled in Frankfurt-am-Main where he met Karl Jonas Mylius (1839-1883), with whom he established a successful architectural practice. One of their first successful commissions was for the layout of Vienna's Zentralfriedhof in 1871, though none of the planned structures were built. In 1876, Mylius and Bluntschli won an international competition for the new Hamburg City Hall, though it was not executed to their designs.

In 1881, Bluntschli was called to assume the leadership of the Department of Architecture at the Polytechnikum, where he taught until 1914. During his Zürich years, Bluntschli built a number of large private residences, several commissions for the Polytechnikum, and the delightful Enge Evangelical Church on the Zürichsee.

Bluntschli was regarded internationally as a talented designer and a gifted teacher. When he died in 1930, his work had largely been eclipsed by more stridently modern tendencies in the profession.

== Major works ==
- Bluntschli Residence, Heidelberg (Germany), 1866
- Layout of Zentralfriedhof (with C. J. Mylius), Vienna (Austria), 1871
- Hotel Frankfurter Hof (with C. J. Mylius), Frankfurt am Main (Germany), 1873-4.
- City Hall (with C. J. Mylius; not executed), Hamburg (Germany), 1876.
- Mannheim Insurance Building, Frankfurt am Main (Germany), 1882.
- Heyl Residence, Worms (Germany), 1882
- Chemistry Department (with Georg Lasius), ETH Zurich (Switzerland), 1884-6.
- Villa Bleuler, Zürich (Switzerland), 1886-7. (See Hermann Bleuler.)
- Physics Department (with Georg Lasius), ETH Zurich (Switzerland), 1886-90.
- Enge Church, Zürich/Enge (Switzerland), 1888-1894.

== Gallery ==
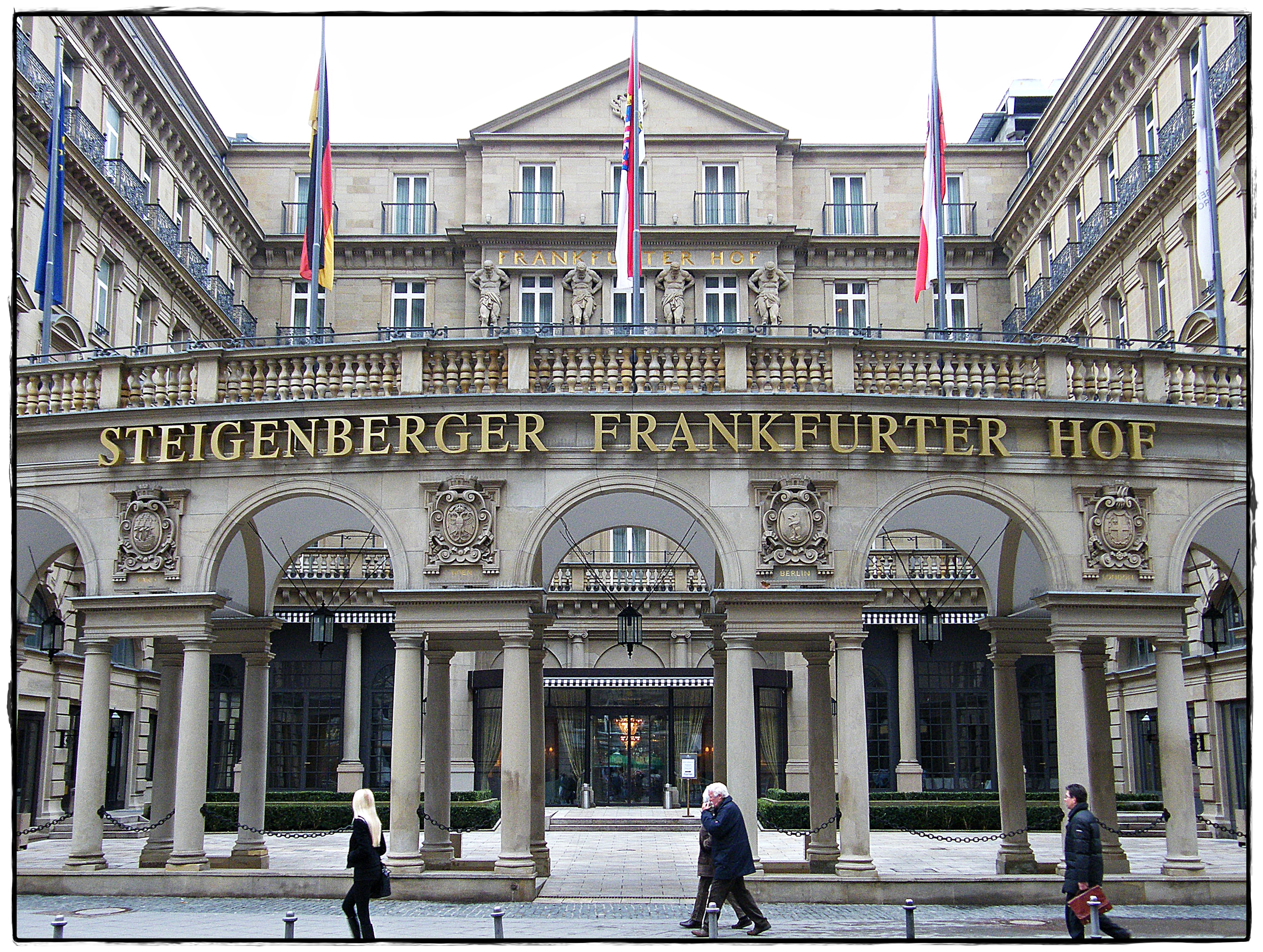
Hotel Frankfurter Hof

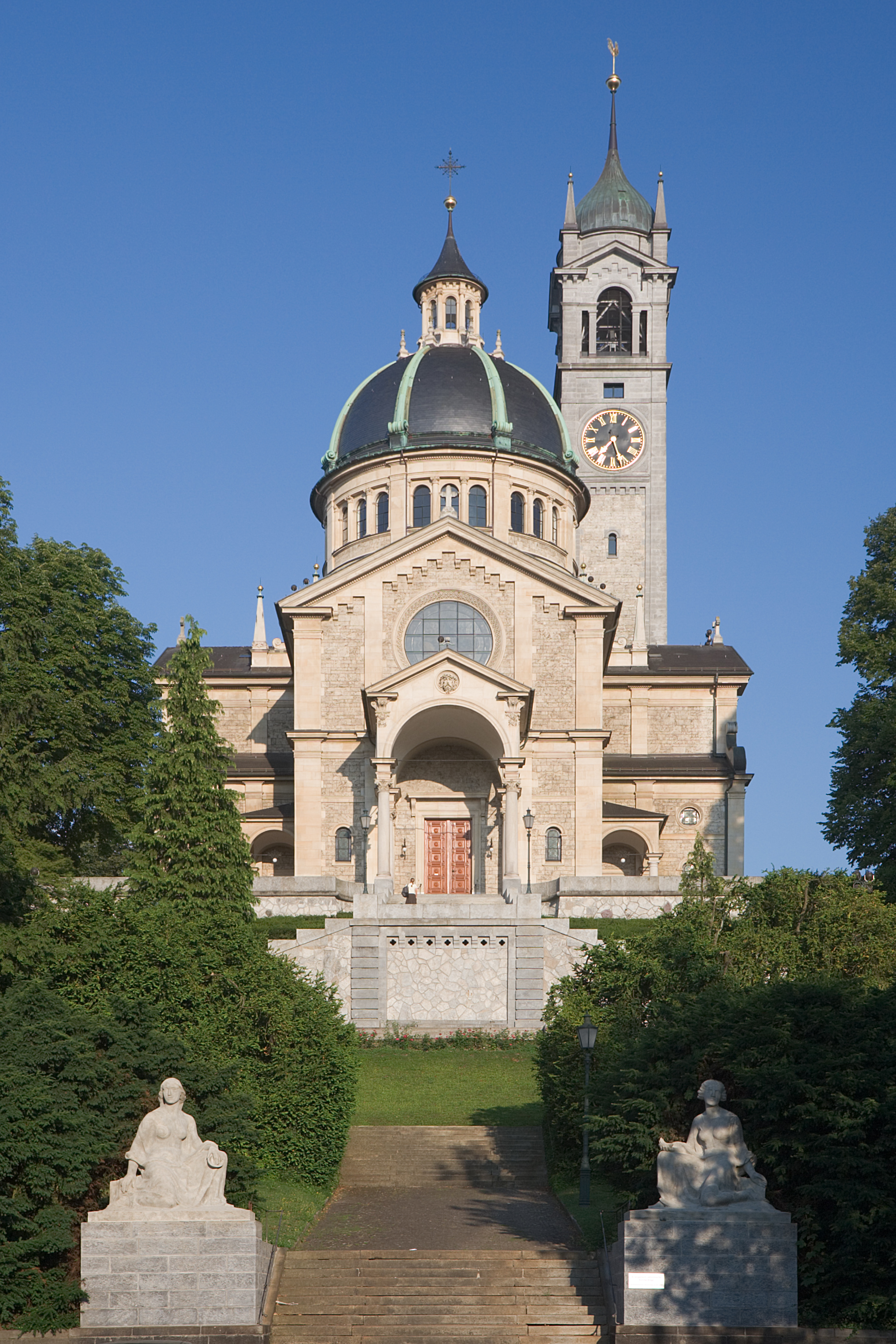
Die Kirche Enge von Osten

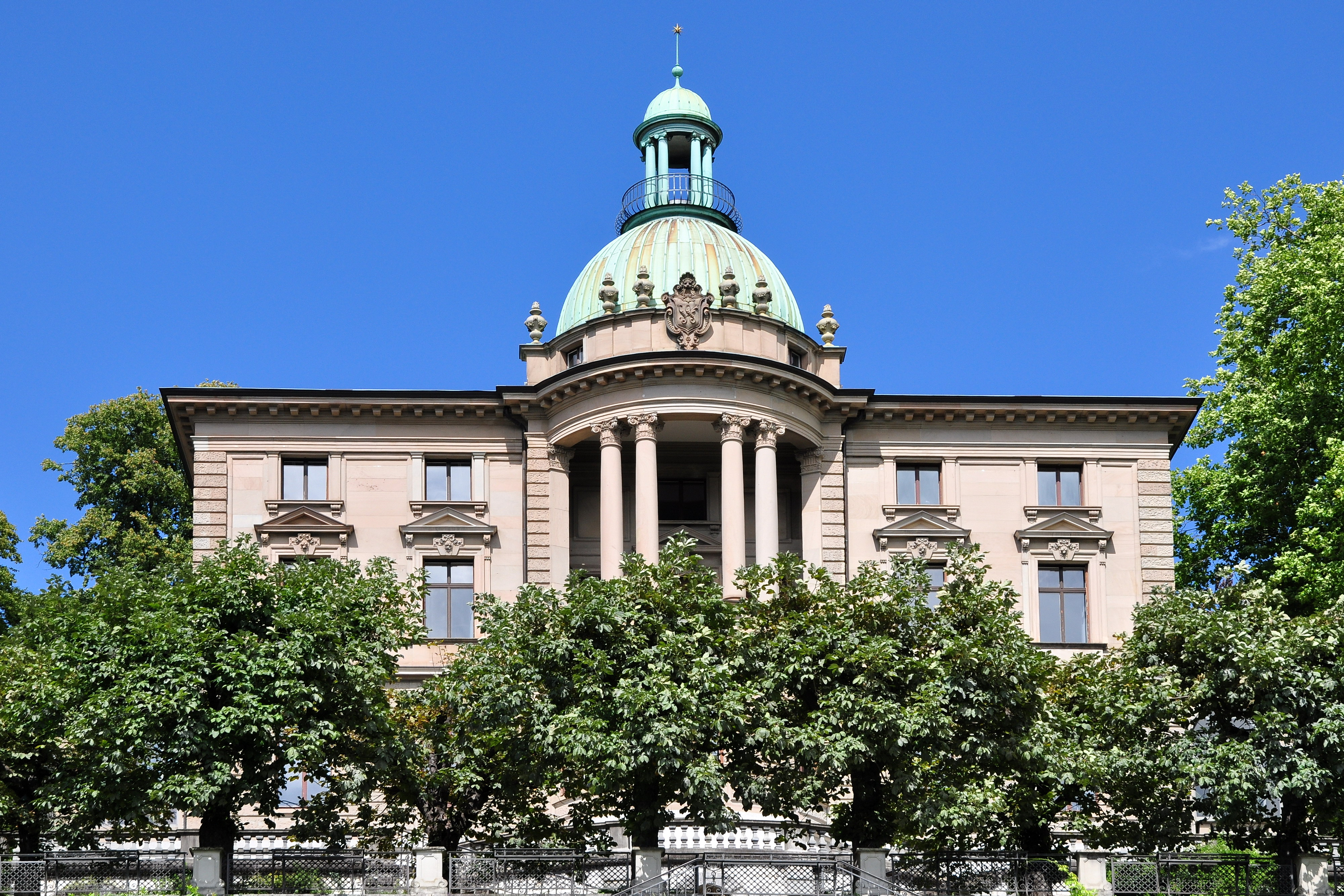
Villa Wegmann

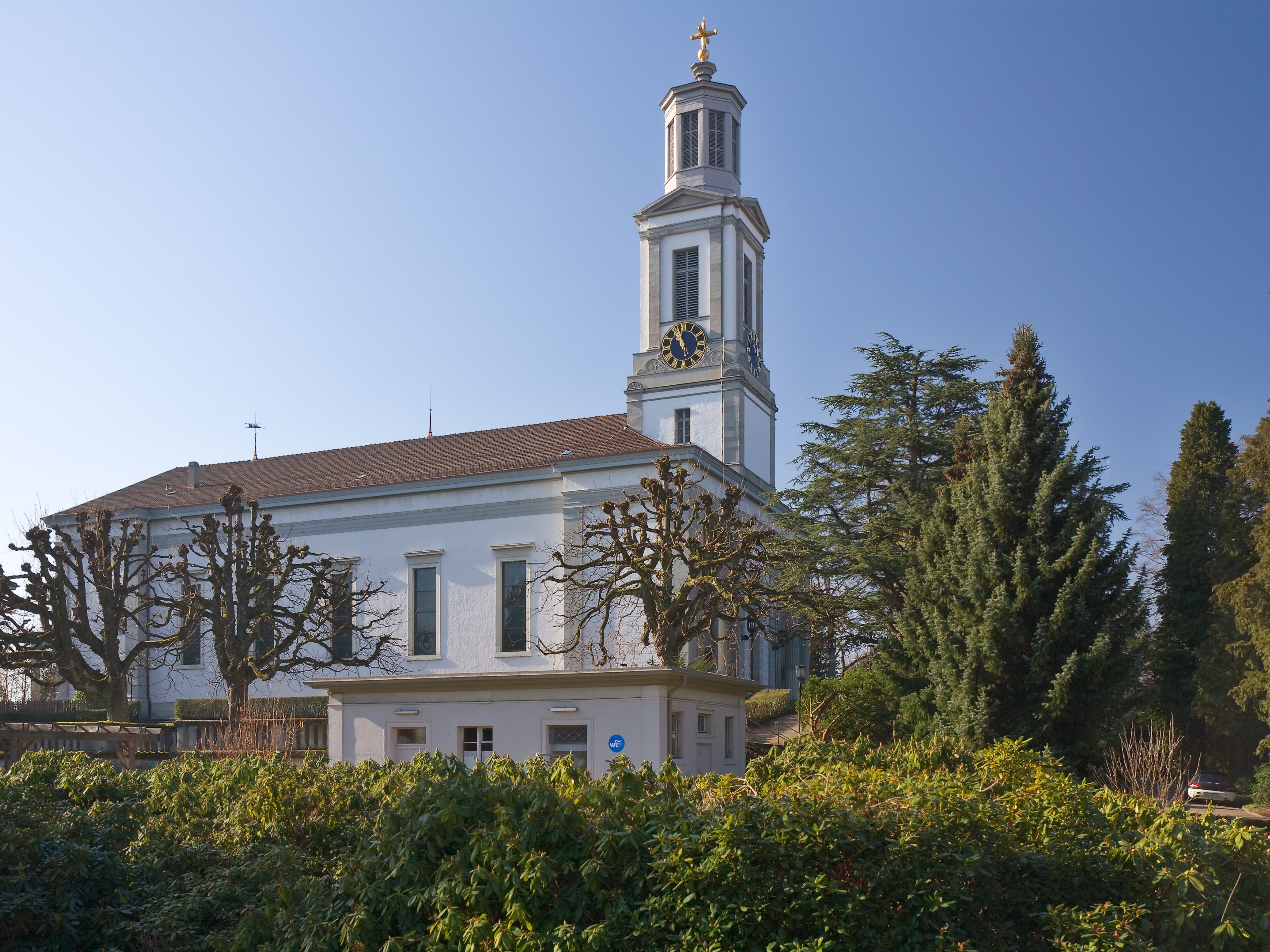
Zürcher Neumünsterkirche, rebuilt by Bluntschli
