= Sigismund Righini =

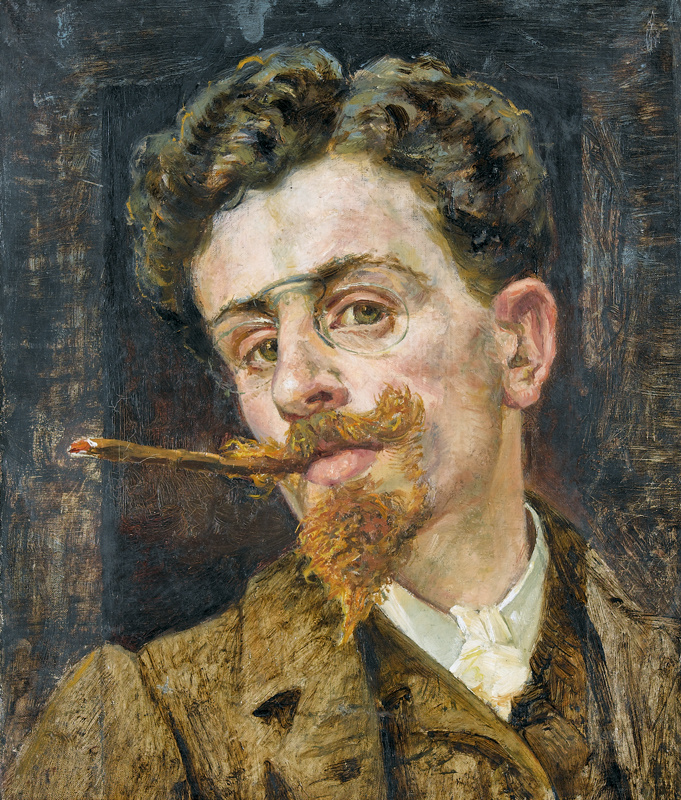
Self-portrait, c.1899

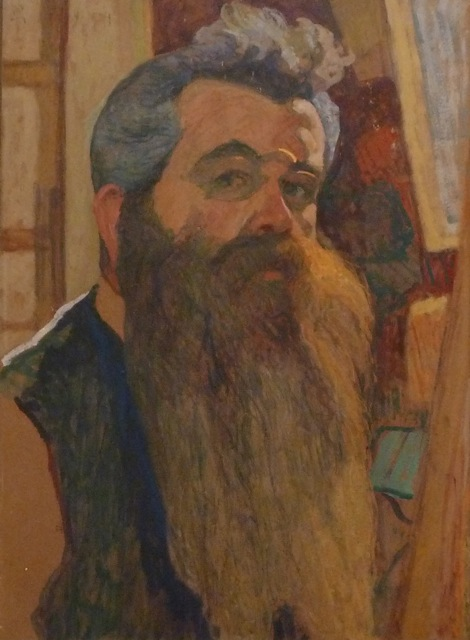
Self-portrait, 1914

Carlo Pietro Sigismund Righini (4 January 1870, Stuttgart - 24 October 1937, Zürich) was a Swiss painter and art association executive.

== Biography ==
He came from a family with a long line of decorative painters, originating in Bedigliora. His father, Francesco (1837–1914), followed the family tradition as well as being a master builder. His mother, Katharina Steinbrecher (1838–1925) was a native of Stuttgart.

He attended school in Zürich. On the advice of Ottilie Roederstein, he left immediately after graduating (in 1888), and went to Paris, where he enrolled at the Académie Colarossi. His first instructor was Jean-André Rixens. While there, he met and engaged with a fellow student, Constance Macpherson (1871–1957), from England. They were married in 1893. After stays in Italy and Ticino, they moved to Zürich. Their daughter Katharina (1894-1973), would later marry the painter Willy Fries and give birth to Hanny Fries, who would also become a painter.

Free from pressing financial obligations, he devoted himself entirely to his work. In 1898, he moved into a new studio, built by his father, where he produced still-lifes, portraits and nudes. He also worked in plein aire for some time, when he was flirting with impressionism. Later, he travelled extensively, visiting the Low Countries in 1903 and England in 1910. In 1904, he began to experiment with brighter patches of color; perhaps influenced by Cézanne and the Fauvists or his friends Giovanni Giacometti and Cuno Amiet. He showed his work at numerous exhibitions until around 1920, when he stopped painting to focus on his membership and executive positions in numerous art associations. During this time, he still did colored pencil drawings while otherwise unoccupied.

After 1915, he was a member of the Federal Art Commission and served as its Vice-President from 1923 until his death. He was an indefatigable promoter of modern art in every position he held. Following World War I, the Federal Council commissioned him to oversee importing art works into Switzerland. This also became a lifelong assignment.

Much of his work is in private hands, but his estate is retained by the Stiftung Righini Fries of Zürich, established by Hanny Fries and her husband Beno Blumenstein (1924–2010). Some paintings are also to be seen at the Kunstmuseum Solothurn and the Kunsthaus Zürich.
