= George H. Mueller =

Honorary Consul of Japan

Honorary Consul of Japan to Zurich, Switzerland
- Incumbent
- Assumed office 1994

Personal details
- Born: George Henry Mueller; 14 November 1951 (age 73); São Paulo, Brazil
- Citizenship: Switzerland; Brazil
- Spouse: Annina Claudia Bodmer (m. 1984)
- Children: 3
- Occupation: Businessman, honorary consul

George Henry Mueller (born 14 May 1951) is a Brazilian-born Swiss businessman who currently serves as Honorary Consul General of Japan to Zürich, Switzerland.

== Early life and education ==
Mueller was born 14 May 1951 in São Paulo, Brasil to Richard Georges Mueller, who also served as honorary consul general of Japan, and Claire Mueller (née Mueller). His paternal grandfather Julius Müller also served as Consul General of Japan from 1955. His father was involved in international trade in the company his father founded in 1927, UHAG Overseas Trading or in French Cosa Commerce Outremer SA, and served as board member of the Industrial Bank of Japan (Switzerland). He is partially of Japanese descent through his paternal grandmother Hatsu Mueller (née Sugiyama).

== Career ==
Upon his fathers death in 1994, the took-over the position as Honorary Consul of Japan to Zurich, Switzerland. In 2009, he was honored by the Japanese government with the Order of the Rising Sun, which was awarded to him at the residence of the incumbent Japanese ambassador Ichiro Komatsu at his residence in Bern, Switzerland. Mueller has been strongly involved in strengthening the friendship between the two nations. He has been president of his family business, Cosa Travel Ltd. (originally UHAG), since the 1980s.

== Personal life ==
Since 1984, Mueller is married to Annina Claudia Mueller (née Bodmer), who was a daughter of Henry C. Bodmer, businessman, philanthropist and controlling shareholder of Abegg & Co. They have two daughters and one son. His son, Henry C. Bodmer, changed his last name from "Mueller" to Bodmer to continue bear the "Bodmer" last name in 2012 as his maternal grandfather had no son. He is married to Ann Atkinson Bodmer, formerly of Tulsa, Oklahoma.

Bodmer resides in Zollikerberg near Zürich, Switzerland.
