= Änne Koken =

German commercial artist

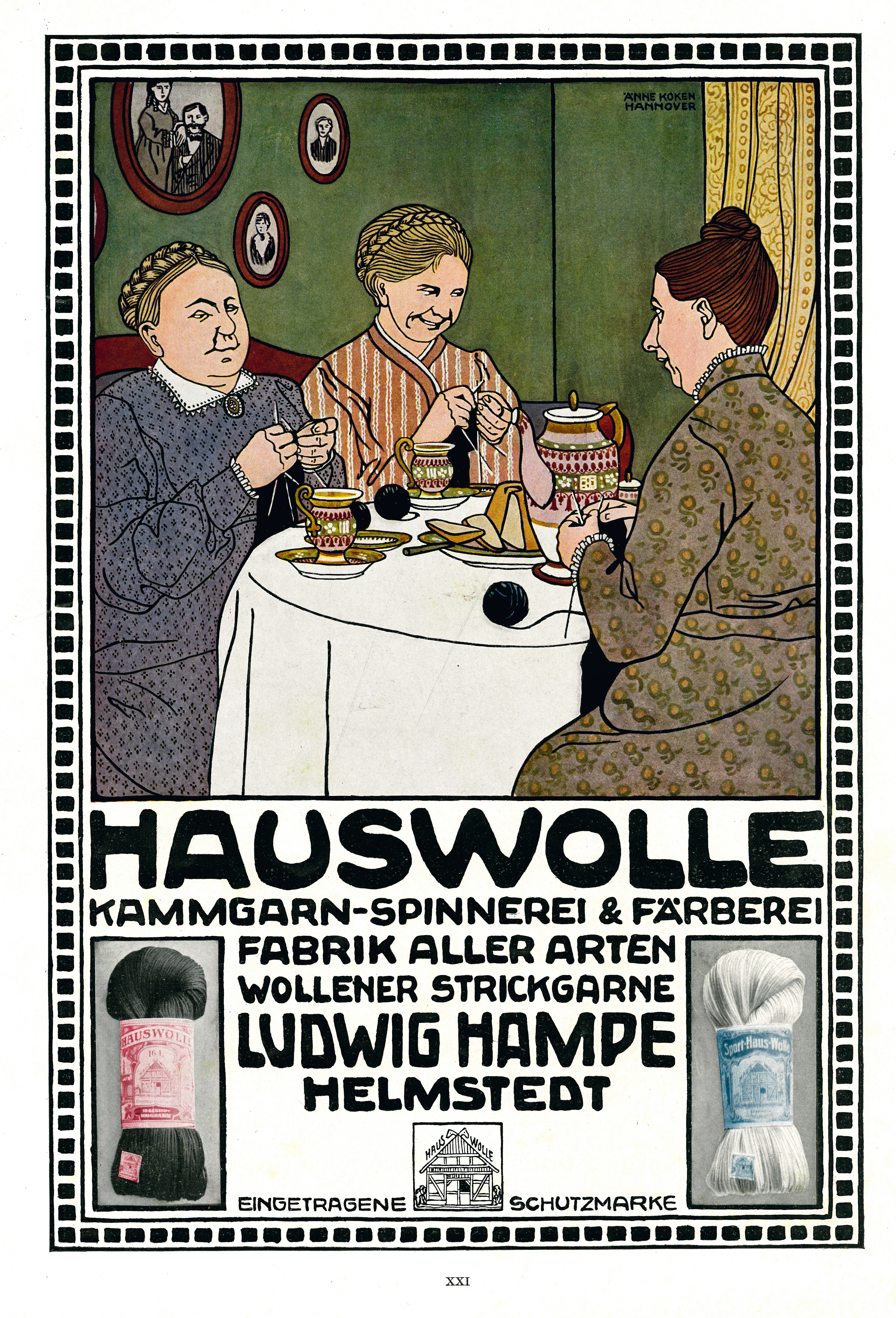
Advertisement for the "Kammgarnspinnerei Hampe", from the Illustrirte Zeitung

Änne Koken (28 May 1885, Hanover - 19 April 1919, Hanover) was a German artist. In addition to landscapes and still-lifes, she designed stained glass, clothing and decorative book covers. She also worked as a commercial artist, notably for the firms Bahlsen and Günther Wagner (a pharmaceutical company, now a division of Pelikan AG).

== Biography ==
Her father was the painter and engraver, Gustav Koken. She presumably took her first art lessons from her father, then studied at the "School for Painting and Decorative Art" in Munich with Hans Eduard von Berlepsch-Valendas, at a time when actual art in advertising was still a new idea.

In 1909, she designed the lobster trademark for the food company, Appel Feinkost which, in a slightly modernized form, is still in use today. A Year later, she opened her own studio in Hannover. In 1911, she became a member of the artistic advisory board of Bahlsen and designed a poster depicting their historic headquarters on the Podbielskistraße. Over the next few years, she helped the company establish its image. She worked for them until her death. After 1912, she designed clothing, hats, and textile pieces that appeared in the magazine Neue Frauenkleidung und Frauenkultur (New Women's Clothing and Culture), which was published until the 1930s.

In 1913, a major article about her in Das Plakat, a magazine devoted to poster art. By 1914, her works were being shown in exhibitions of more conventional art, including that of the Deutscher Werkbund. She was also elected a board member at the Museum August Kestner. In 1918, she participated in the first exhibition of the Hannoversche Sezession. As a member of the "Vereins für Deutsche Frauenkleidung und Kultur" (Association for German Women's Clothing and Culture), she campaigned for women's rights.

In 1919, she died of pneumonia; two weeks after giving birth to her daughter.
