= Carl Abegg-Arter =

Swiss industrialist, silk merchant and banker

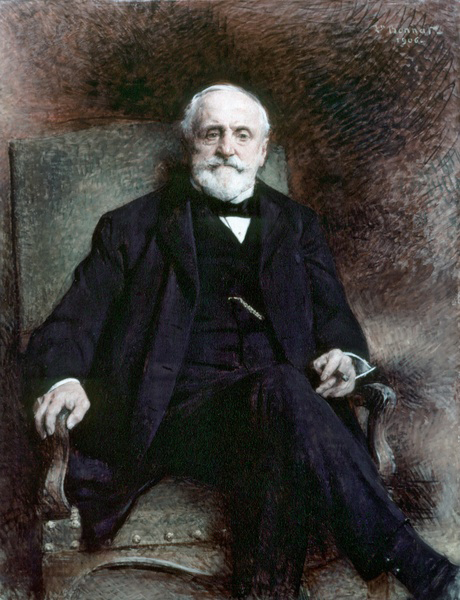
- Oil portrait of Abegg by Leon Bonnat
- Born: Carl Abegg; 10 April 1836; Küsnacht, Zürich, Switzerland
- Died: 23 August 1912 (aged 76); Zürich, Zürich, Switzerland
- Resting place: Enzenbühl Cemetery, Zürich, Switzerland
- Known for: Founding and leading Abegg & Co, chairman of Schweizerische Kreditanstalt
- Spouse: Emma Auguste Arter (m. 1859)
- Children: 3

Signature
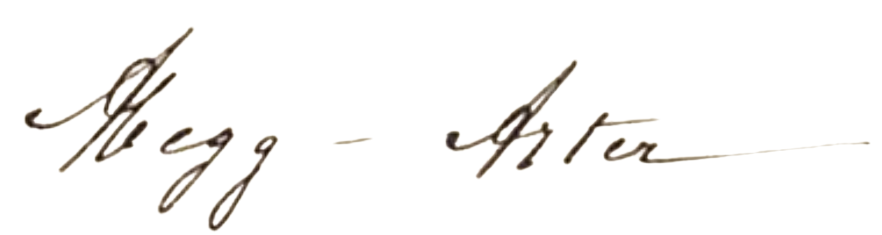

Carl Abegg known as Carl Abegg-Arter (10 April 1836 – 23 August 1912) was a Swiss businessman, merchant and founder of Abegg & Co, a leading silk merchant firm, based in Zurich. Abegg has been widely considered the richest Swiss citizen at the time.

== Early life and education ==
Abegg was born on 10 April 1836 in Küsnacht, Switzerland, the second of three children, to Johann "Hans" Caspar Abegg (1803–1850), a cloth merchant, and Anna Regula Abegg (née Bleuler; 1815–1857). He had an older brother who died only aged one month and a younger sister, Lina Niederer (née Abegg 1840–1868).

He completed the Industrial School of Zürich, where he completed his Matura. Between 1852 and 1855, he was sent to Milan, Italian Empire, where he learned the silk trading business in an apprenticeship at the company Heinrich Fierz-Etzweiler. After his return he briefly worked at the silk factory Salomon Rütschi & Compagnie in Hottingen.

== Career ==
In 1857, aged 21, he was sent to New York City to represent his employer Salomon Rütschi & Compagnie. In 1861, he and August Rübel, whom he met in the United States, formed Abegg & Rübel, which was primarily active in silk, commodities and banking, and can be seen as predecessor company of today's Abegg & Co. This company was turned into the current partnership in 1885.

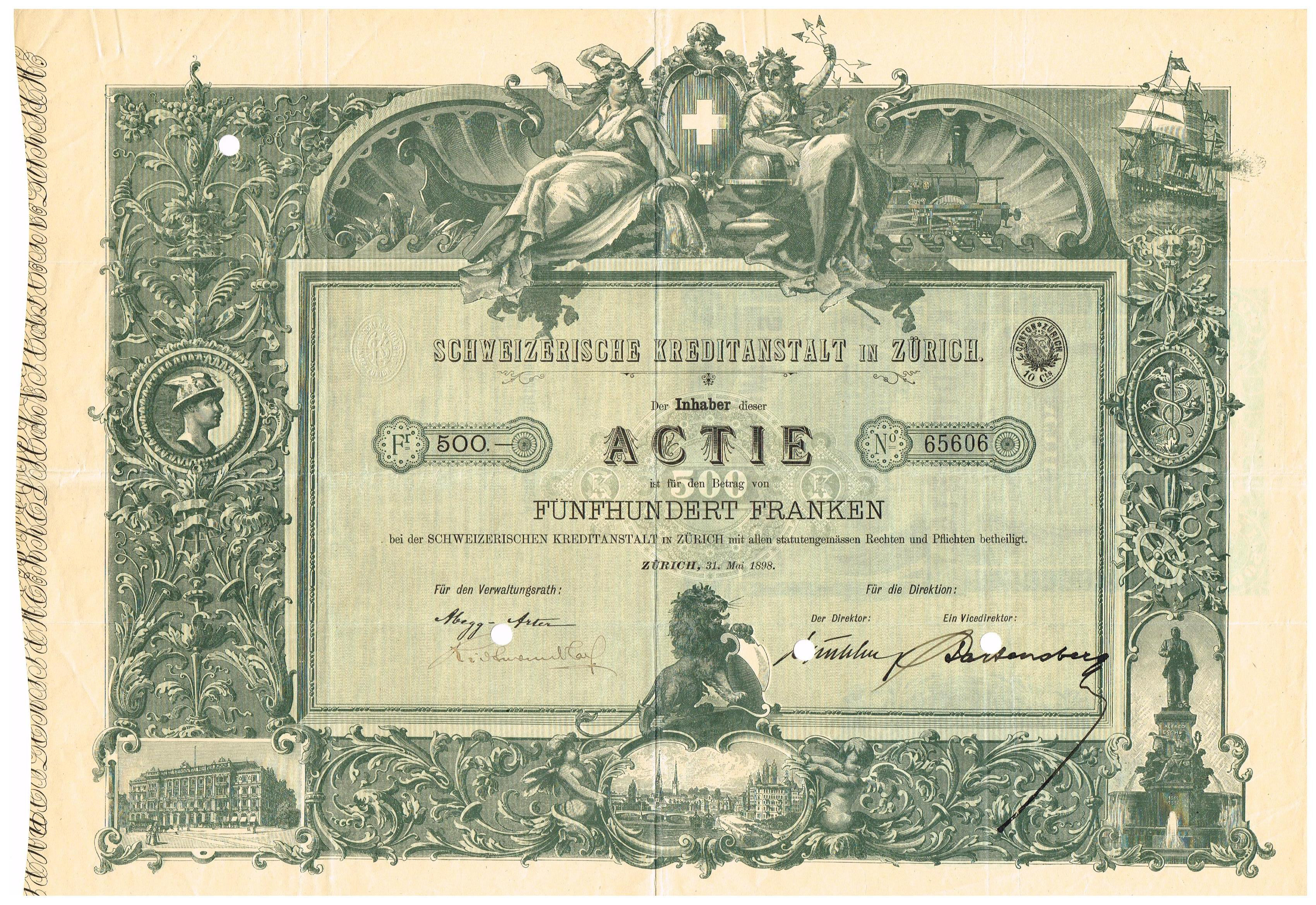
Share certificate of SKA, signed by Abegg-Arter

Since 1868, Abegg was a member of the Schweizerische Kreditanstalt (Credit Suisse), and served as president/chairman between 1883 and 1911. He was the vice-president and co-founder of Zurich Insurance Group, a board member of Gotthard railway in 1890, a board member of the Silk Weavery Höngg in 1890. Between 1895 and 1911, Abegg was also the president of Elektrobank/Elektrowatt and in 1910 briefly a member of Chemins de fer Orientaux (railways) Abegg was also a long-term member of the Zurich Court of Commerce.

== Personal life ==
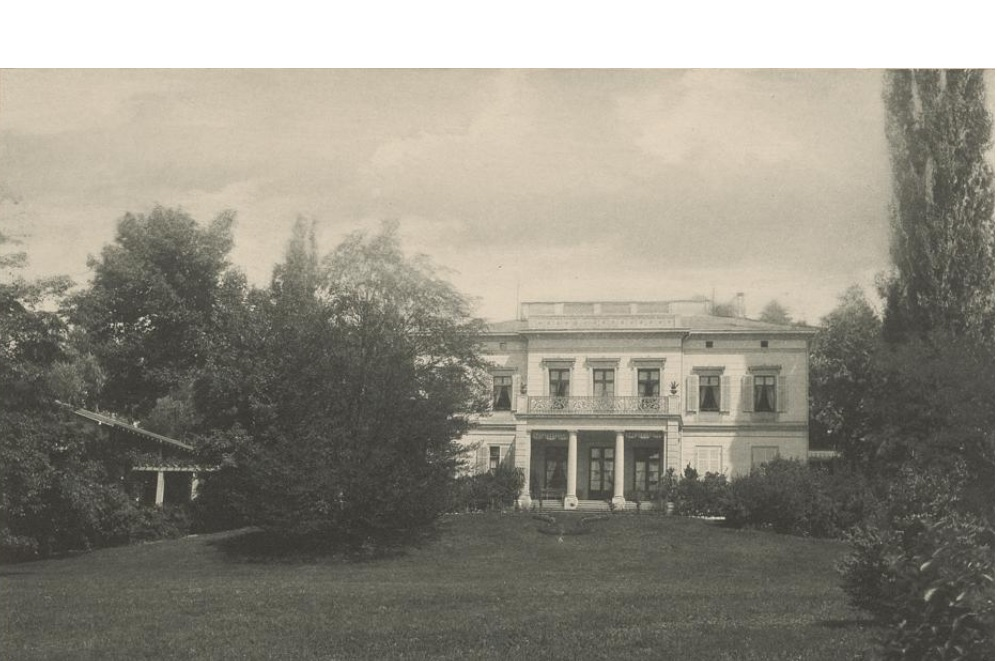
Villa Seeburg, Abegg-Arter's residence

On 4 October 1859 Abegg married Emma Auguste Arter, a daughter of Solomon Arter of Hottingen. They had three children;

- Carl Abegg (20 October 1860 – 16 September 1943), principal owner of Abegg & Co and board member of several companies, married Anna Henriette Stockar (1868-1969), divorced 1937; three children; Carl Julius Abegg (1891-1973), Hilda Eleonore Anna "Annie" Abegg (1897-1996) and Werner Abegg (1903-1984).
- August "Augusto" Abegg (31 December 1861 – 2 November 1924), most important 'cotton manufacturer' in Northern Italy and pioneer in the industrial manufacturing of viscose/rayon.
- Emma Lina Abegg (23 March 1869 – 9 December 1949), who would marry Wilhelm Caspar Escher (1859–1929), who was a banker and board member of several companies such as Nestlé and Anglo-Swiss Condensed Milk Company

Abegg-Arter resided at Villa Seeburg in Hottingen (Zürich).
