= Abegg & Co =

Swiss private investment firm

- Company type: Private Company
- Industry: Private equity, Real estate, Public equity
- Founded: 1885; 140 years ago in Zürich, Switzerland (1955, single family office)
- Headquarters: Zürich, Switzerland
- Key people: Henry C. Bodmer (Chairman); Annina Bodmer Müller (Board member); George H. Mueller (Board member); Daniel Hasler (Board member); Pauline Wetter (Board member)
- AUM: US$600 million (2023)
- Number of employees: 5-10
- Website: abeggco.com

Abegg & Co (officially Abegg & Co AG) is a Swiss private investment firm that manages the capital of the Bodmer family. The firm that is based in Zürich, Switzerland was originally formed in 1885, and converted into a single family office in 1955. Today, the company is owned by the fourth generation of the family, and acts as one of the oldest single family offices in Switzerland, with approximately $600 million in assets under management. Today the firm is focused on private equity, real estate and public equity.

== Activities ==
The operating companies are managed by Abegg & Co Holding AG in Zug, Switzerland.

=== Operating Companies ===
- Cosa Mirai Ltd. (commercial and residential real estate holding)
- Cosa Travel (travel agents)
- 3D AG (micro and nanotechnology)
- Abegg & Co Ltd. (family office)

== History ==
In 1885, Carl Abegg-Arter (1836-1912) and his son Carl Abegg-Stockar (1860-1943), formed Abegg & Co as successor company to Rübel & Abegg which was a partnership in silk trading started in 1881. The company soon held the various interests and activities of the family and in 1955 was established as corporation and single family office. In 1984, the Müller family (UHAG Übersee-Handel AG, respectively COSA Commerce Outre-Mer SA), married into the Abegg family. This venture established the trade and relations between Switzerland and Japan, representing leading Swiss companies across Asia and North and South America.

Currently, the family is also associated with operating the Honorary Consulate of Japan in Zürich. In more recent history, the Bodmer family, who was a majority owner in the industrial concern Huber+Suhner sold a 10.1% controlling interest stake in 2019, they (respectively the family holding) was the second largest single shareholder.
