= Avenida 20 de Noviembre =

Avenue in the historic center of Mexico City

- The avenue seen from the Zócalo, looking south
- Former names: Callejuela (Pasaje de la Diputación), Calle de Ocampo
- Namesake: 20 November 1910, start of the Mexican Revolution
- Width: 37 m (121 ft) (first block), 27 m (89 ft) (rest)
- Location: Historic center of Mexico City
- North: Zócalo
- South: Tlaxcoaque

Construction
- Construction start: 6 April 1934
- Inauguration: 20 November 1936

Other
- Designer: Vicente Urquiaga y Rivas

Avenida 20 de Noviembre is an avenue in the historic center of Mexico City. It runs south from the Zócalo (Plaza de la Constitución) to Tlaxcoaque, where it meets the Calzada de Tlalpan. It was cut through the old city between 1934 and 1936, replacing two narrow streets, the Callejuela (also called Pasaje de la Diputación) and Calle de Ocampo. It opened on 20 November 1936, the 26th anniversary of the start of the Mexican Revolution.

The avenue is centered on the Metropolitan Cathedral, which closes the view to the north. The 1933 decree made it 37 metres (121 ft) wide in the first block and 27 metres (89 ft) wide in the rest. About 75 houses and buildings were demolished to open it, among them the old El Puerto de Liverpool department store. Others were cut back, like the church of San Bernardo. Since 2014 it has been a semi-pedestrian street.

== History ==
=== Before the avenue ===
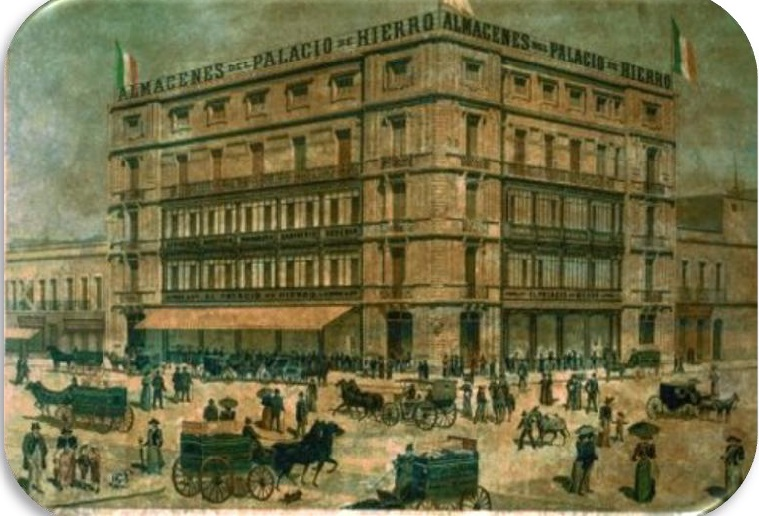
The first El Palacio de Hierro building in 1898

Before 1934 there was no straight street from the Zócalo south to Tlaxcoaque. South of the square was the Callejuela, a narrow passage between the old city hall and the Portal de las Flores. It ran one block, from the square to Calle de San Bernardo (now Venustiano Carranza). South of that was Calle de Ocampo, opened in 1861 through the convent of San Bernardo. Further south the street pattern was irregular, with alleys like Cerrada de Jesús and Callejón del Ave María, and with vecindades (tenements) and brothels near the Tlaxcoaque chapel.

Calle de San Bernardo was then a downtown shopping street with several of the city's big department stores. El Palacio de Hierro was on the west corner of the Callejuela and El Puerto de Liverpool on the east corner. One block west, at Monterilla (now 5 de Febrero), were Al Puerto de Veracruz, Las Fábricas Universales and El Nuevo Mundo.

=== Opening (1933–1936) ===
==== Project ====
The idea of a central avenue from the Zócalo to Tlaxcoaque dates from the 1920s. Architect Alfonso Pallares proposed it in 1923–1924. In 1927 urban planner Carlos Contreras included it in his preliminary master plan for the city, 46 metres (151 ft) wide at the square and 30 metres (98 ft) in the rest. Contreras gave it two purposes: to relieve traffic at the square with a commercial avenue, and to make room on the Zócalo for a Federal District government building to balance the city hall. The city council was abolished in 1928 without having built it.

The Federal District Department took up the project. On 16 May 1933, under President Abelardo L. Rodríguez and Department head Aarón Sáenz, an executive committee was named: engineers Roberto Servín (president) and Evaristo Araiza (secretary), León Audibert (treasurer) and architect Vicente Urquiaga y Rivas (technical adviser), who drew up the project and its financial plan.

The decree was published in the Diario Oficial de la Federación on 15 December 1933. It declared of public utility the alignment of the streets of La Diputación and Ocampo and their continuation to Calzada de Chimalpopoca, to form the avenue "del 20 de Noviembre". The expropriation zone ran from the Zócalo south to Chimalpopoca, between 5 de Febrero on the west and Pino Suárez and San Antonio Abad on the east.

The project was changed soon after demolition began; the final version was approved on 15 June 1934. In the first block the west side was kept, i.e. the city hall and El Palacio de Hierro, and the east side was demolished. The works program gives a width of 31.5 metres (103 ft) for that block. South of Venustiano Carranza the east side was kept. The program called for sparing the church of San Miguel, which lost only its old cemetery, and the Tlaxcoaque chapel.

==== Works and inauguration ====
The avenue under construction, 1934

Works next to the church of San Bernardo, 22 October 1934

Demolition began on 6 April 1934 with the buildings facing the Zócalo and along the Callejuela. That year the west side of Ocampo, Calle de San Miguel and the tenements at Nezahualcóyotl and Callejón del Ave María followed. In 1935 the old El Puerto de Liverpool building came down, along with Cerrada de Jesús, the blocks between Mesones and San Miguel and the rest of Callejón del Ave María. In 1936 the remaining buildings between Mesones and Regina were demolished.

The avenue opened on 20 November 1936, from the Zócalo to Calle de Cuauhtemotzin (now Fray Servando Teresa de Mier). Adolfo Ruiz Cortines, then a senior official of the Department and later president of Mexico, unveiled the plaque near the corner of República de El Salvador. By then the work had cost 2,200,000 pesos; the property owners who benefited paid 75% and the Department the rest.

There was criticism of the demolition of colonial-era houses while the work went on. Urquiaga wrote in 1938 that the owners of the big stores in the area, among them El Palacio de Hierro and El Puerto de Liverpool, welcomed the project.

==== Buildings affected ====
Church of San Bernardo

Properties demolished or cut back in the first stage (1934–1936), from north to south, per the list Urquiaga published in 1938:

- Plaza de la Constitución 21, 23, 25 and 25 bis. Houses on the south side of the square, the first to be demolished.
- El Puerto de Liverpool. The old building, at the corner of the Callejuela and San Bernardo, stood in the middle of the new avenue. Demolished in 1935.
- Church of San Bernardo. Built in the 17th century; it had already lost a section in 1861. In 1935 part of the nave was cut off to align it. The east portal was taken apart and rebuilt facing the avenue. Manuel Toussaint wrote that the church was left with the proportions of a chapel.
- House at the corner of Ocampo and Venustiano Carranza, and Ocampo 2 and 4.
- House of the Count of la Cortina (corner of República de Uruguay). 18th century. Its patio was demolished and a new facade built in the style of the house.
- República de Uruguay 97 and 99.
- República de El Salvador 106, 108, 110, 113 and 115.
- Cerrada de Jesús 5, 7, 9, 11 and 13. The street disappeared.
- Mesones 100 and 102.
- Baños de San Felipe de Jesús. Public baths between Mesones and Regina, with entrances on both streets, once considered among the best in the city.
- Regina 69, 71, 76 and 78.
- San Jerónimo 85, 87, 88, 89, 90 and 92. No. 88 was, by tradition, the birthplace of Saint Philip of Jesus. It dated from the 16th century and stood in the center of the avenue.
- Church of San Miguel. Kept; only the old cemetery behind it was affected.
- San Miguel 119, 120, 123 and 125. No. 119 was a tenement of 41 dwellings; the part facing Callejón del Ave María was demolished.
- Nezahualcóyotl 172 to 182 and Callejón del Ave María. Tenements. The alley, known for prostitution, disappeared.
- Lots at the south end, on Calle de Cuauhtemotzin, Plaza de Tlaxcoaque, 5 de Febrero, Chimalpopoca and San Antonio Abad.

==== Department stores ====
Liverpool Centro, by Enrique de la Mora (1936)

The avenue went right through the corner where the big stores of Calle de San Bernardo stood.

- El Puerto de Liverpool. Jean-Baptiste Ebrard started in 1847 with a stall on the Zócalo. In 1853 he bought a house at the corner of the Callejuela and San Bernardo, behind the Portal de las Flores. The corner building, by Rafael Goyeneche, had a mansard roof; one source dates it to 1898 and another says its metal frame arrived from Germany in 1905. In 1927 Paul Dubois finished a new building next door, designed with a future widening of the alley in mind, but the final axis of the avenue did not match its alignment. Once the Goyeneche building was gone, Enrique de la Mora remodeled the Dubois building: he added bays, two floors and a facade on the avenue, with a cylindrical corner tower clad in black tile. Engineer Miguel Rebolledo built it. It opened in 1936 with the first escalators in the city. During demolition a poster hung on the old building showing a worker smashing it with his fist.
- El Palacio de Hierro. It was on the west side of the Callejuela, the side whose alignment was kept, and so ended up fronting the avenue. The present building is by Paul Dubois, from 1921; the earlier one burned on 15 April 1914.
- El Nuevo Japón. A store owned by Japanese merchant Heijiro Kato, at Ocampo and San Bernardo, across from Liverpool (now 20 de Noviembre 36). The French-style building with mansards was kept. After the avenue opened it was given a neocolonial facade of tezontle and stone. Telas Atoyac occupied it, and from 1948 Telas Junco.

=== After 1936 ===
The second part of the project was a monumental square at Tlaxcoaque, the "Plaza del 20 de Noviembre", with neocolonial buildings around the chapel and two diagonal avenues. It was approved on 26 June 1936. By 1938 the 31 buildings affected were almost all demolished, but the work stalled until the 1950s. The Jeanne d'Arc building, also by Urquiaga, was built in the 1940s on the model planned for the square. On 20 November 1956 a monument to Francisco I. Madero by sculptor José María Fernández Urbina was unveiled at the crossing with Fray Servando.

At the north end, on the site of the Portal de las Flores, the new Federal District Department building (one of the Mexico City administrative buildings) was built from 1941 to 1948, by Federico Mariscal and Fernando Beltrán.

In the late 1950s the Súper Almacén Junco was built at the corner of República de Uruguay in five months and 19 days. It was a functionalist store with parking on the three upper floors, by engineer Roberto E. Medellín. It is now a Suburbia store.

== The avenue today ==
Aerial view of the avenue

There are colonial, Porfirian, neocolonial, Art Deco and functionalist buildings along the avenue. Of the colonial ones, the church of San Bernardo, the church of San Miguel Arcángel and the Tlaxcoaque chapel are still there.

It is a commercial avenue. Near the Zócalo are El Palacio de Hierro and Liverpool, two of the oldest department stores in the city. Further south, toward José María Izazaga, there are mostly clothing stores.

On the east side, between República de El Salvador and Mesones, is the Hospital de Jesús, founded by Hernán Cortés; it is the oldest hospital in the country. The modern building is by José Villagrán García, from the 1940s.

=== Semi-pedestrian street ===
In December 2014 the city government's Public Space Authority carried out the pilot project "#micalle" on the avenue, with advice from Bloomberg Associates. Two lanes were left for vehicles, with drop-off bays, and the bike lane was restored. Pedestrians gained 2,730 square metres (29,400 sq ft), marked with paint on the pavement and with planters and street furniture. In October 2017 the same agency announced works to make the semi-pedestrian layout permanent, with new sidewalks along about 13 blocks. They were to start on 1 November and finish at the end of December of that year.

=== Transportation ===
Traffic runs south to north, from the Calzada de Tlalpan toward the Zócalo. At the north end is Zócalo/Tenochtitlan station on Line 2 of the Metro. Metrobús Line 4 crosses the avenue on República de El Salvador.

== Gallery ==
Hatter of the Portal de las Flores, by Louis Falconnet, 1865

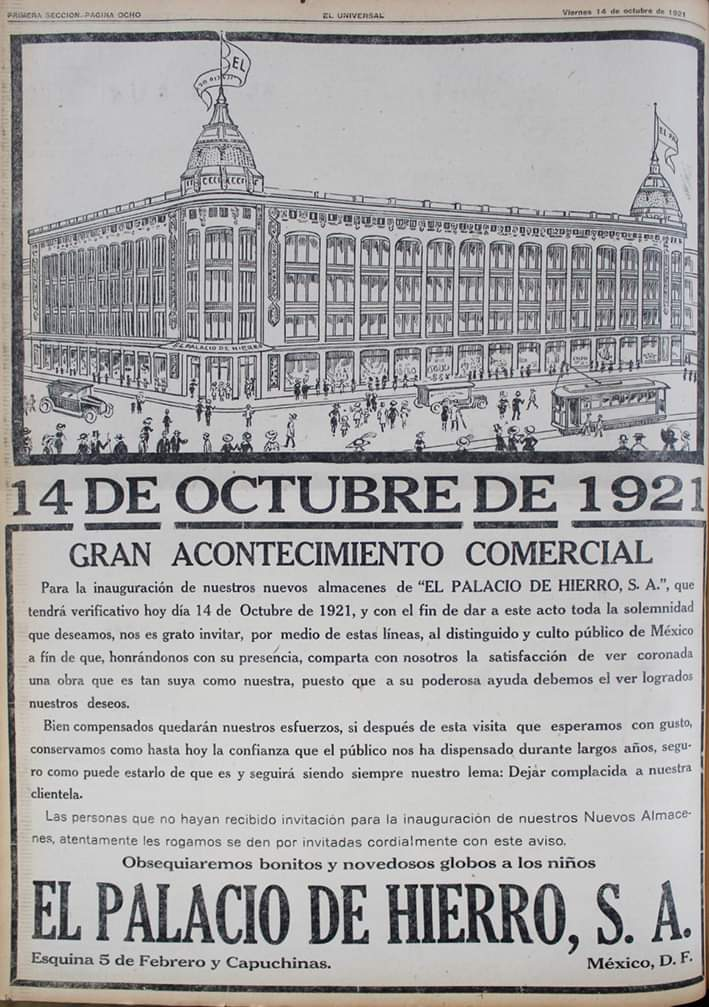
El Palacio de Hierro in 1921

El Palacio de Hierro Centro

Building at the corner of República de Uruguay

Hospital de Jesús

Tlaxcoaque chapel

Bike lane toward the Zócalo
