= Nuevo Mundo =

Nuevo Mundo may refer to:

- El Nuevo Mundo, a chain of department stores in Mexico
- Nuevo Mundo (Madrid Metro), a light-rail station in Madrid
- Nuevo Mundo (magazine), an illustrated magazine published between 1894 and 1933 in Madrid, Spain
- Nuevo Mundo (San Jose, California), Spanish weekly newspaper published from 1996 to 2005 in San Jose, California
- Nuevo Mundo (town), a small city in Bolivia
- Nuevo Mundo Dam, a dam in Cuba
- Nuevo Mundo Lake, a lake in Bolivia
- Nuevo Mundo Television, Spanish-language Canadian TV network
- Nuevo Mundo volcano, a volcano in Bolivia

== See also ==
- Mundo Nuevo, Spanish magazine published from 1894 to 1933
