= Azerbaijan–Mexico relations =

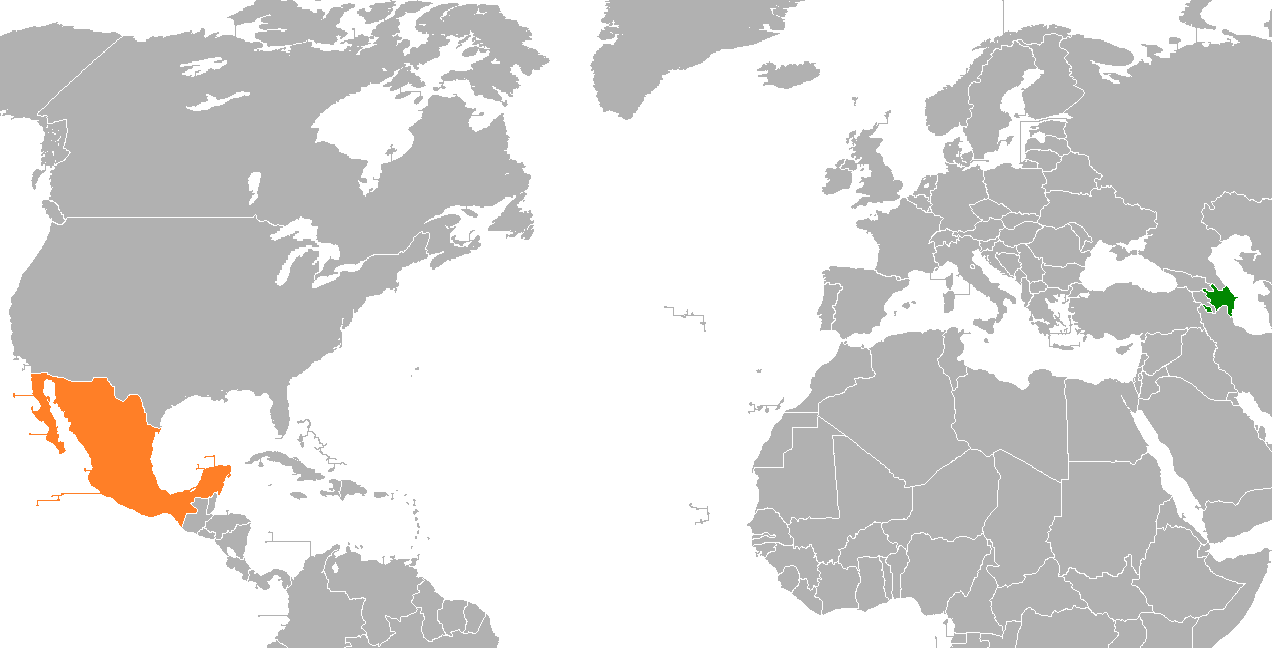

- Azerbaijan: Mexico

The nations of Azerbaijan and Mexico established diplomatic relations in 1992. Both are members of the United Nations.

== History ==
Azeri President Ilham Aliyev and Mexican President Enrique Peña Nieto attending the Nuclear Security Summit in Washington, D.C.; 2016.

In May 1978, Mexican President, José López Portillo, visited Baku during a visit to the USSR. In April 1982, future President Heydar Aliyev paid a visit to Mexico as head of a Soviet delegation and met with President Portillo. At the time, Aliyev was only a candidate of the Soviet Politburo. In December 1991, Mexico recognized the independence of Azerbaijan after the Dissolution of the Soviet Union. On 14 January 1992, both nations established diplomatic relations.

At first, bilateral diplomatic relations were conducted via non-resident embassies; Azerbaijan was represented from its embassy in Washington, D.C., United States, and Mexico from its embassy in Ankara, Turkey. In 2007, Azerbaijan opened an embassy in Mexico City. In 2011, the Mexican Senate recognized the Khojaly Massacre. However, on 8 February 2023, the Mexican Senate adopted a document recognizing the Armenian genocide committed by Ottoman forces in 1915, citing the need to protect universal human rights.

In April 2008, Mexican Foreign Undersecretary Lourdes Aranda Bezaury paid a visit to Azerbaijan to attend the first Mexico-Azerbaijan meeting for political consultations and met with counterpart Foreign Minister Elmar Mammadyarov. During the visit, both nations discussed strengthening political ties and the potential for economic cooperation, trade, tourist exchange between the two countries was explored. Both nations also signed bilateral agreements.

To commemorate the 200th anniversary of Mexican independence, Mexico allowed certain foreign countries to remodel parks and squares with monuments of their countries. In November 2012, The government of Azerbaijan chose to place a monument of former President Heydar Aliyev on the main Paseo de la Reforma in Chapultepec Park and another monument in remembrance to the Khojaly Massacre in Plaza Tlaxcoaque. However, relations between both nations came to an all-time low when soon after the unveiling of the statue of former Azeri President Heydar Aliyev; several residents of Mexico City accused the local city government of allowing the Azeri government of placing a statue of a "dictator" in the city. It was proposed that the local government should remove the statue and place it elsewhere, however, the Azeri embassy in Mexico City protested that if the statue were to be moved, "Azerbaijan may break diplomatic relations with Mexico." In the end, the statue of President Heydar Aliyev was moved to a private home in the city and in retaliation, the Azeri government withheld US$3.8 billion in investments. In the same month, a Mexican advisory commission said authorities had erred by accepting money to allow a foreign government to "essentially decide which political figures or historic events should be commemorated in Mexico City's public spaces." Adding that "a plaque on the monument [dedicated to massacre] calling the Azerbaijani deaths "genocide" was misleading." Recommending that authorities take action, it was decided that the word "genocide" was to be removed and replaced with "massacre".

In 2014, a delegation of Mexican Senators paid an official four-day visit to Azerbaijan, led by Senator Gabriela Cuevas Barrón. That same year, Mexico opened an embassy in Baku. In November 2017, two Mexican Congressional Deputies, while on an official visit to Armenia as part of the Mexico-Armenia Friendship Group on the invitation of the Armenian government; visited Armenian-held Nagorno-Karabakh (which is internationally recognized as part of Azerbaijan). Their visit created a diplomatic flare-up between Azerbaijan and Mexico.

In December 2018, Azeri Foreign Minister Elmar Mammadyarov attended the inauguration of Mexican President Andrés Manuel López Obrador.

In 2022, both nations celebrated 30 years of diplomatic relations. In 2023, Azeri Deputy Foreign Minister Elnur Mammadov arrived to Mexico City to attend the Third Mexico-Azerbaijan meeting for political consultations with his counterpart, Foreign Undersecretary Carmen Moreno Toscano.

== High-level visits ==
High-level visits from Azerbaijan to Mexico

- Foreign Minister Elmar Mammadyarov (2011, 2012, 2018)
- Deputy Prime Minister Ali S. Hasanov (2012)
- Foreign Vice Minister Elnur Mammadov (2023)

High-level visits from Mexico to Azerbaijan

- Foreign Undersecretary Lourdes Aranda Bezaury (2008)
- Senator Carlos Jimenez Macias (2011)
- Senator Francisco Arroyo Vieyra (2012)
- Senator Gabriela Cuevas Barrón (2014)

== Bilateral agreements ==
Both nations have signed several bilateral agreements such as an Agreement on Academic Diplomatic Cooperation between the Azeri Ministry of Foreign Affairs and the Mexican Secretariat of Foreign Affairs (2008); Memorandum of Understanding for the Establishment of a Mechanism of Consultation in Matters of Mutual Interest (2008); Agreement on Visa Exemption for Diplomatic Passport holders (2008); Agreement on the issue of joint brands between both nations Postal Services (2010); Agreement of Cooperation in Telecommunications, Information and Communication Technologies (2010); and an Agreement of Cooperation in the Fields of Education, Science, Youth, Culture and Sports (2017).

== Trade relation ==
In 2023, two-way trade between both nations amounted to US$7.2 million. Azerbaijan's main exports to Mexico include: sheets and strips of aluminum, turbojets and other gas propellers, printing machines, x-ray machines, and petroleum. Mexico's main exports to Azerbaijan include: tubes and pipes made from iron or steel, nickel based products, machinery and mechanical appliances, mineral materials, chemical based products, and alcohol.

== Resident diplomatic missions ==
- Azerbaijan has an embassy in Mexico City.
- Mexico has an embassy in Baku.
Building hosting the Embassy of Mexico in Baku

== Gallery ==
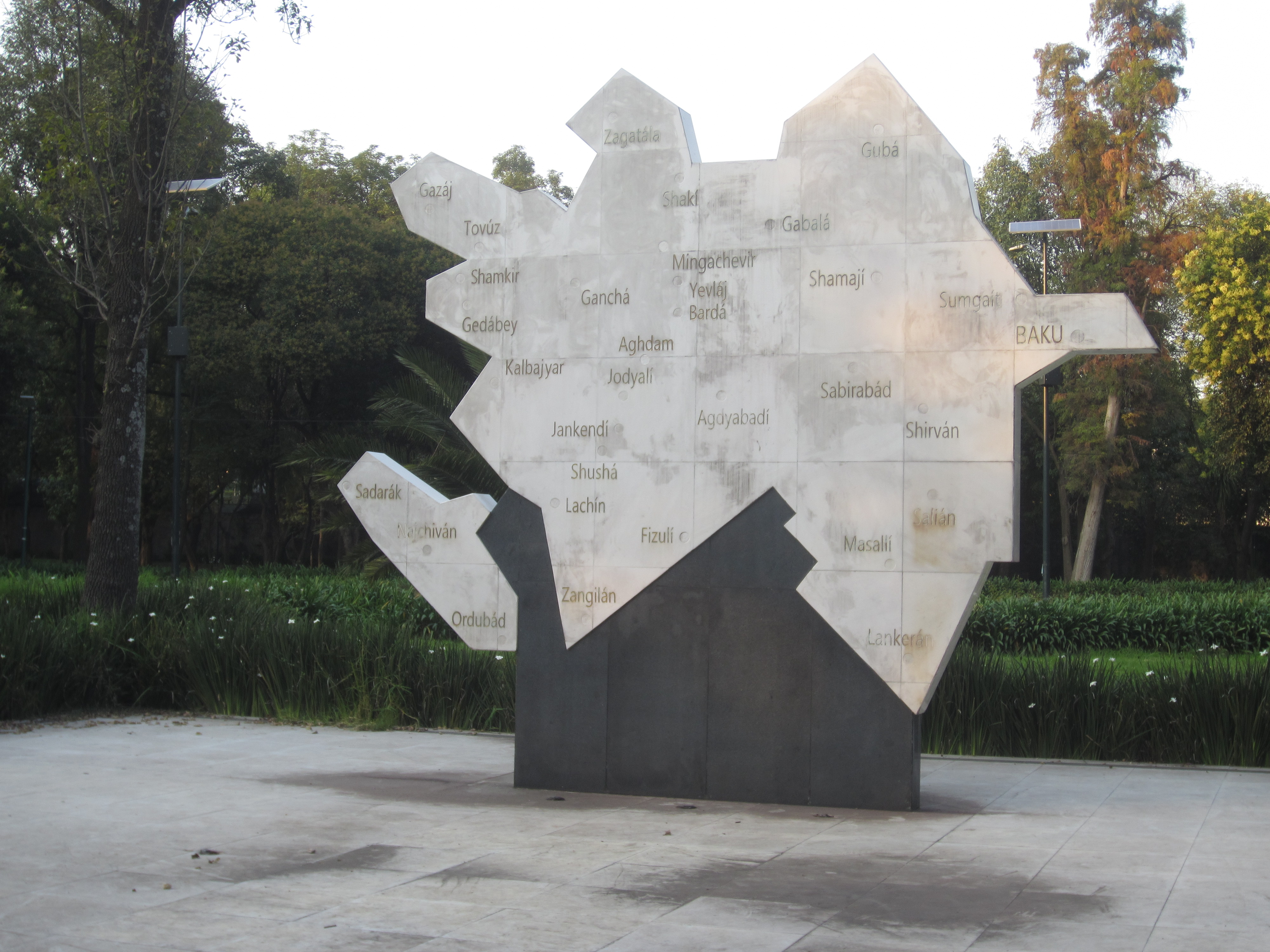
Stone map of Azerbaijan in Mexico City (the statue of President Heydar Aliyev was relocated)

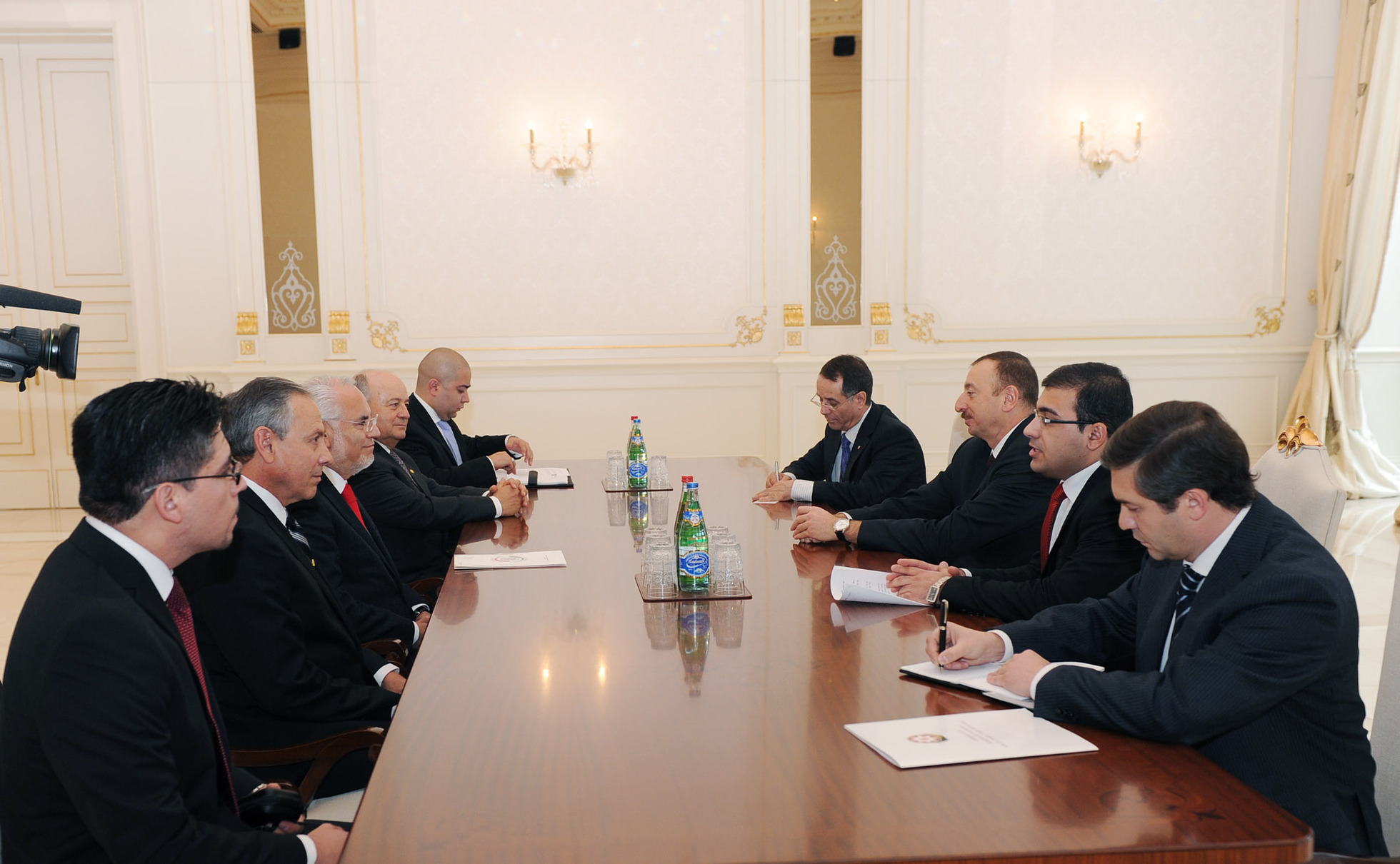
Meeting between Azeri President Ilham Aliyev and a delegation of Mexican Senators in Baku; 2011

A church in Tlaxcoaque, Mexico City renovated by the Azeri government and a Memorial to the Khojaly massacre next to it

March in Baku marking the 20th anniversary of the Khojaly massacre and thanking Mexico for recognizing the massacre

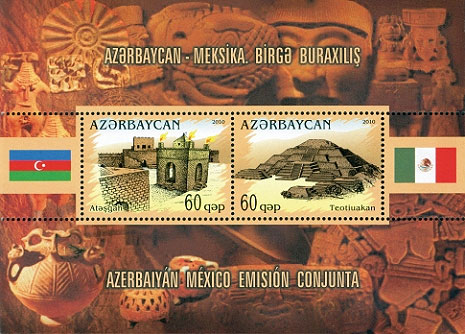
Commemorative stamps produced by Azerbaijan in 2010

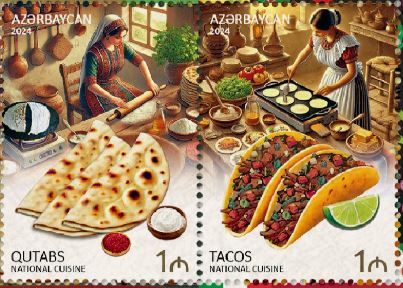
Commemorative stamps produced by Azerbaijan in 2024

== See also ==
- Statue of Heydar Aliyev, Mexico City
- Tlaxcoaque
