= Mexico City administrative buildings =

Coordinates: 19°25′54.3″N 99°8′0.68″W

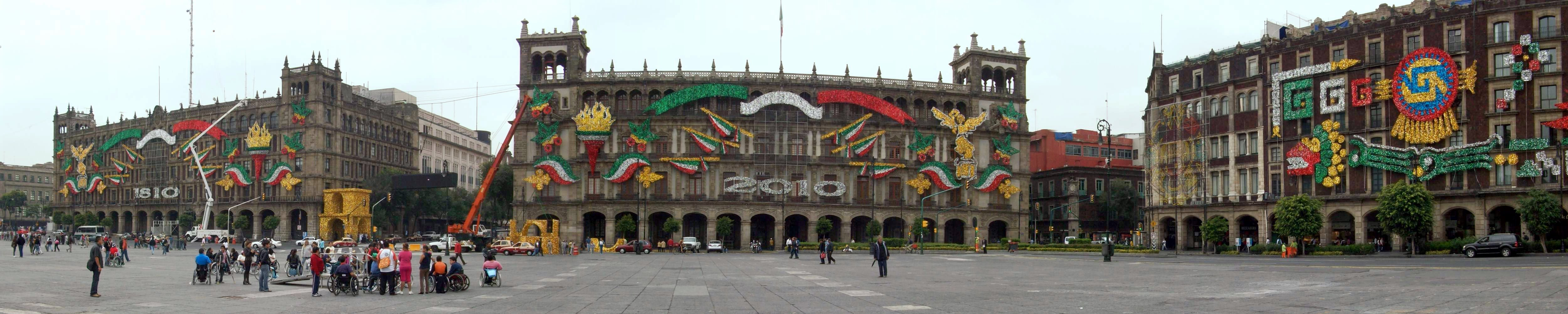
Looking south to the Mexico City administrative buildings. Far right is the former Portal de Mercaderes. All of the buildings were decorated for the 2010 Bicentenario celebrations

The Mexico City administrative buildings are two buildings on the south side of the Zócalo in Mexico City divided by the avenue Avenida 20 de Noviembre. They house offices of the governing authority of Mexico City. The building to the west of 20 de Noviembre is the older one and has been the site of city administration since the Conquest. The one to the east is newer, built in the 20th century.

== Federal District ==
Similar to other capital cities, like Washington, D.C., Mexico City is considered as belonging to the nation, rather than being part of a particular state. What is now the federal district used to be principally part of the State of Mexico until 1824, when the Mexican Congress decided to put the capital in Mexico City. At the time, the State of Mexico had its headquarters in the old Palace of the Inquisition (Now the Museum of Medicine) but then had to move to Texcoco. The government of Mexico City and the Federal District are one and the same, causing Mexicans to use the terms interchangeably. While it is still considered under federal jurisdiction, recently, changes have been made, such as the allowing of direct elections of the Chief or "mayor" of the District.

== Original town hall ==
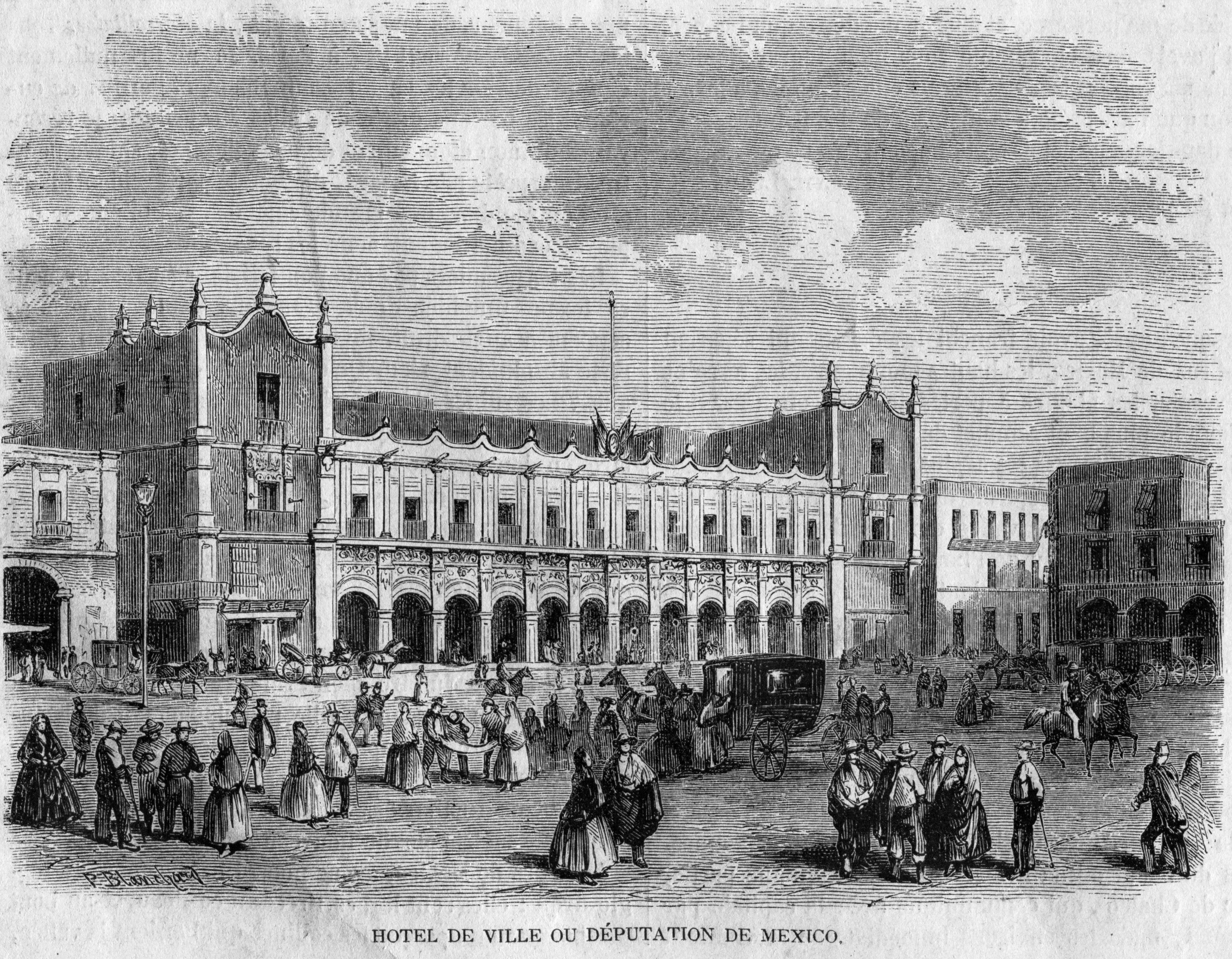
The 1720–1724 built Palacio del Ayuntamiento or Palacio de la Diputación (L'Illustration, 1862).

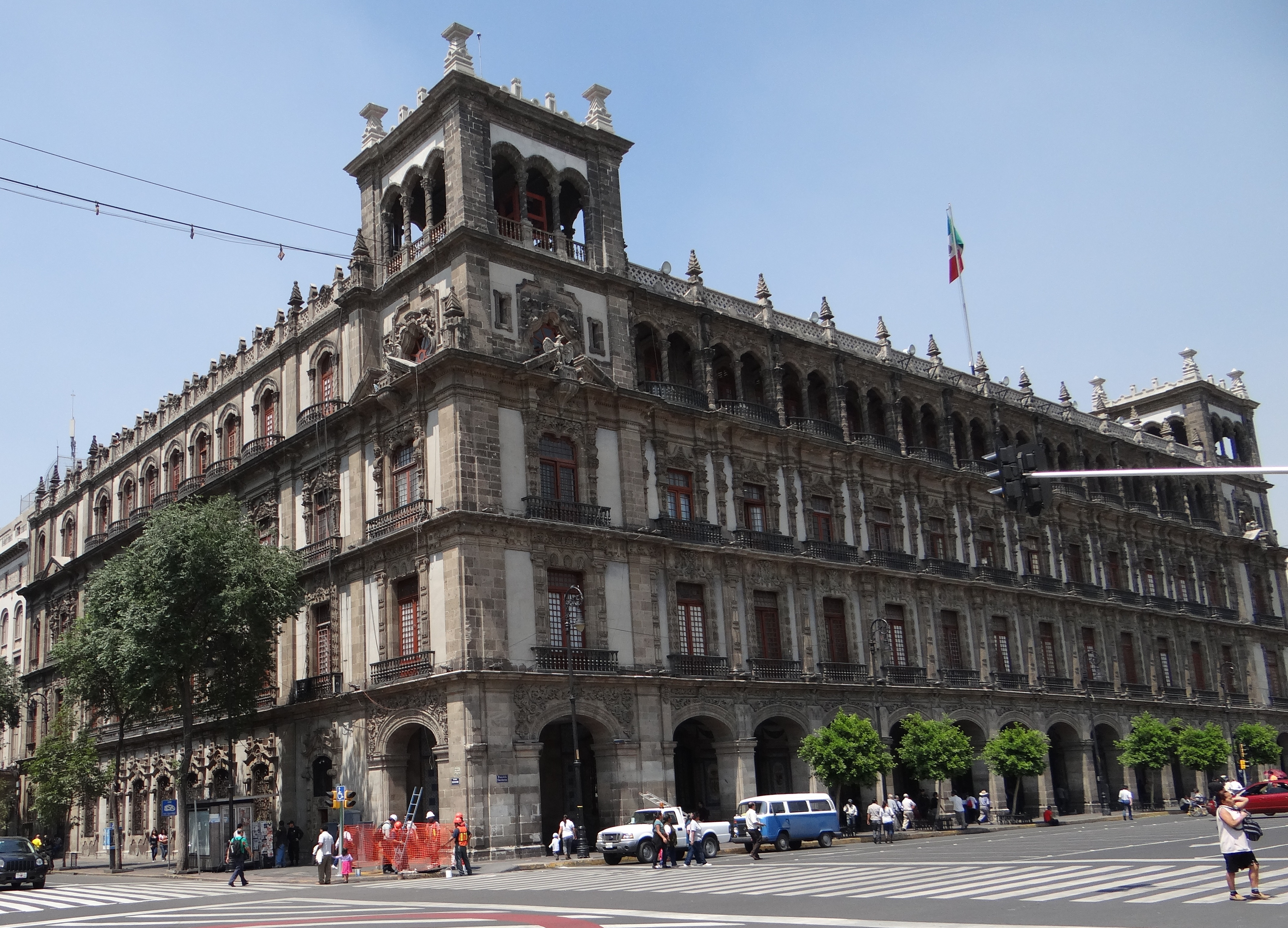
The 1910–1930 remodeled Palacio or "old" Federal District building

The first local authority in New Spain was the ayuntamiento (district council) of Villa Rica in Veracruz, established where Hernán Cortés came ashore in the early 16th century. The governing council moved to Coyoacán, near Mexico City, after the fall of the Aztec city Tenochtitlan. The ayuntamiento moved here after the first town hall was built between 1526 and 1532, with the first recorded council meeting here in 1526. It was built as a fortress against the Indians, who were forbidden to settle in the area. It had a large meeting room, a scrivener's room to keep records, another for accounting, and audience hall, a chapel and a sacristy. This building also housed a government-controlled butchers and granary Since then, the governing body and building have gone by several names including the "Casas Consistoriales", the "Casas de Cabildos", the "Palacio de la Diputación", the "Sala de Cabildos" and the "Consejo Consultivo de la Ciudad." The building was expanded in 1582.

In 1582, a jail was added, the first such in New Spain. Other functions were added to the building such as a coin-making facility, a foundry and residences. This building was destroyed, along with the National Palace in the famine uprising in 1692 . As the building burned, its archives were saved by Carlos de Sigüenza who, with the help of friends and paid servants threw them out of the windows as the building burned, saving records going back to 1524 In 1714, viceroy Fernando de Alencastre, 1st Duke of Linares ordered the building reconstructed. Work began in 1720 under viceroy Baltasar de Zúñiga, 1st Duke of Arión, who managed to have the portals built. The rest of the building was completed in 1724 under viceroy Juan de Acuña, marqués de Casafuerte. The official corn and meat markets located here were abolished and the free market was allowed to take control of these commodities. This resulted in a bustling market in what was the Alley of the Diputación, now 20 de Noviembre. However, these stalls disappeared by 1888.

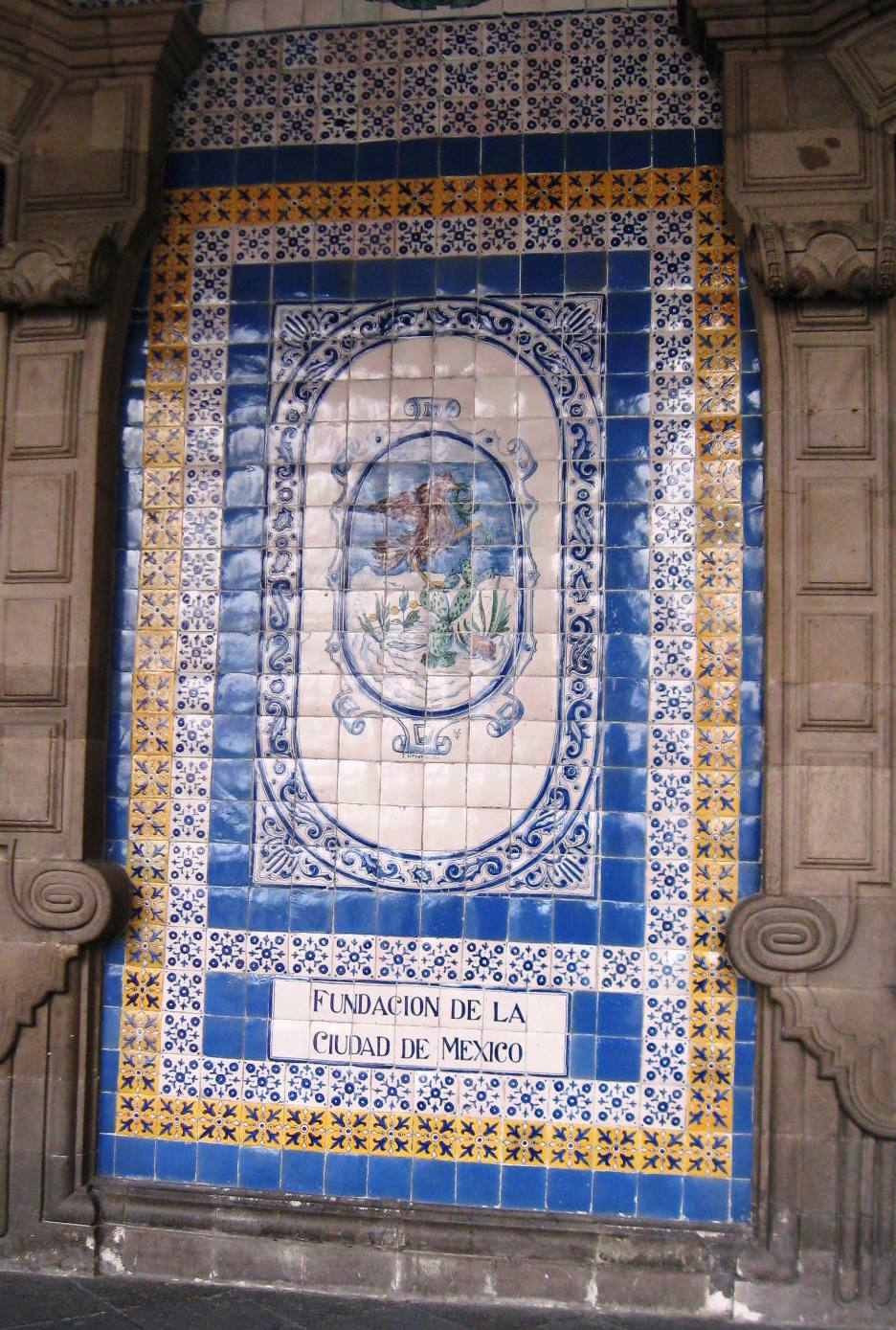
Mural celebrating the founding of Mexico City

In 1910, the building was remodeled for the upcoming centennial of Independence by architect Manuel Gorozope and engineer Guillermo Beltrán. The remodeled building was inaugurated on 16 September (independence day) 1910. However, remodeling work went on from 1912 to 1930 with the addition of the main staircase, the library and the archives, even though work was periodically halted because of the Mexican Revolution. In 1921, another floor was added as well as square towers on the corners on both sides of the main facade. This front facade has talavera tile murals with the coats of arms of Coyoacán, where the ayuntamiento was before here, of the founding of Mexico City, of Christopher Columbus, of Hernán Cortés, of Mexico City as authorized by Charles V and of Villa Rica de la Vera Cruz. In some places, some of the foundations of the original building can still be seen. In 1948, the district council moved from here to the new building built next door, but it moved back here in 1997.

The exterior of the building is topped by two square corner towers, each containing three small arches, whose balustrade appears to spill over the pediments and the eagles that overlook the Zocalo.

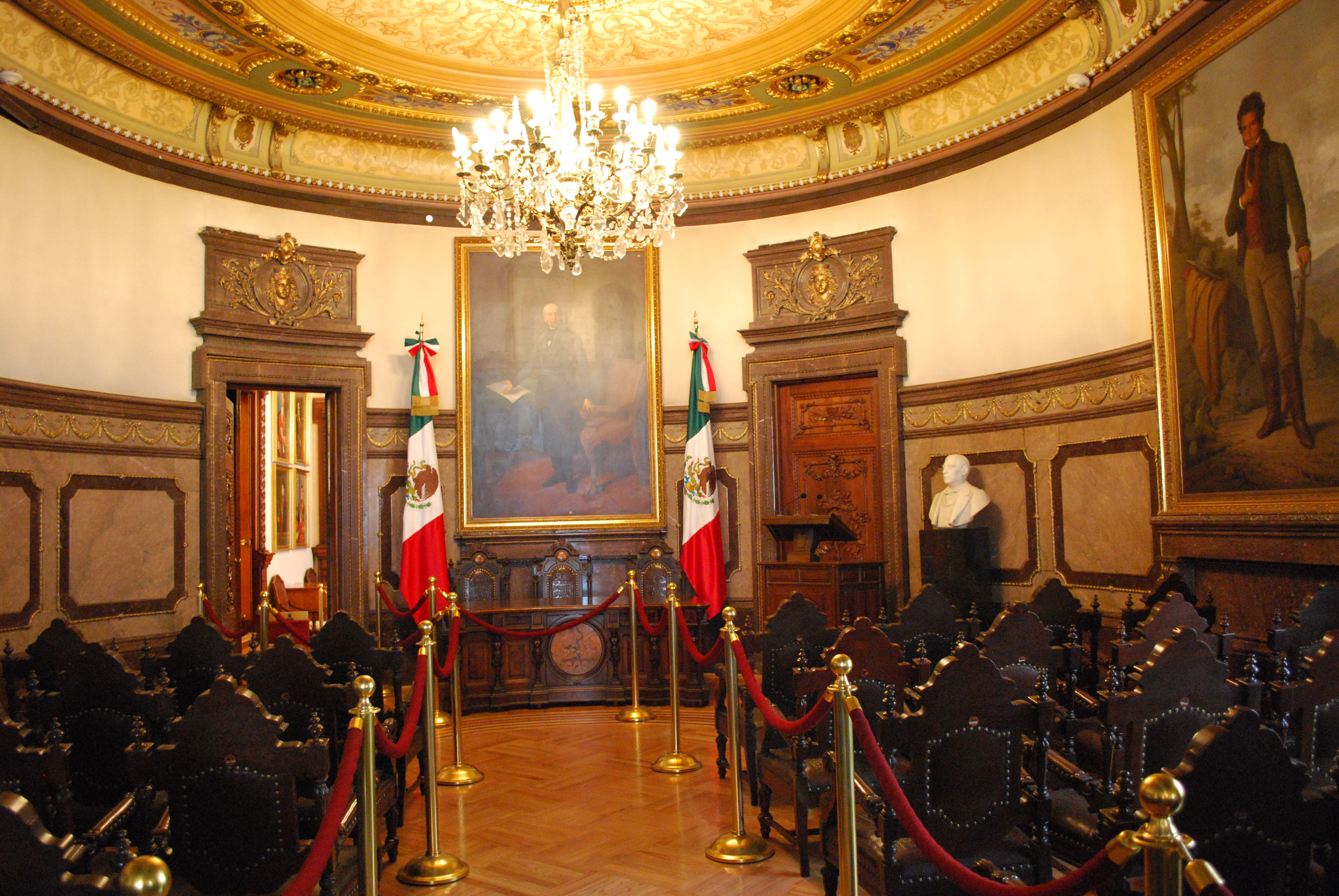
Salon de Cabildos

The interior has large powerful arches, with richly decorated moulding at the main entrance. These lead to a double arcade covering a monumental staircase created by architect Alvaro Aburto. On each side of the stairwell are two patios surrounded by arches and columns. The left patio is done in Venetian-style mosaics with images fruits and vegetables as well as large pitchers. The right side patio is home to the Salon de Cabildos, which was recently restored and open for public viewing. It was the place that the city council traditionally convened to settle local disputes. The entry hall to the Salon contains a gallery of portraits of all 62 Spanish viceroys.

== Edificio de Gobierno building ==
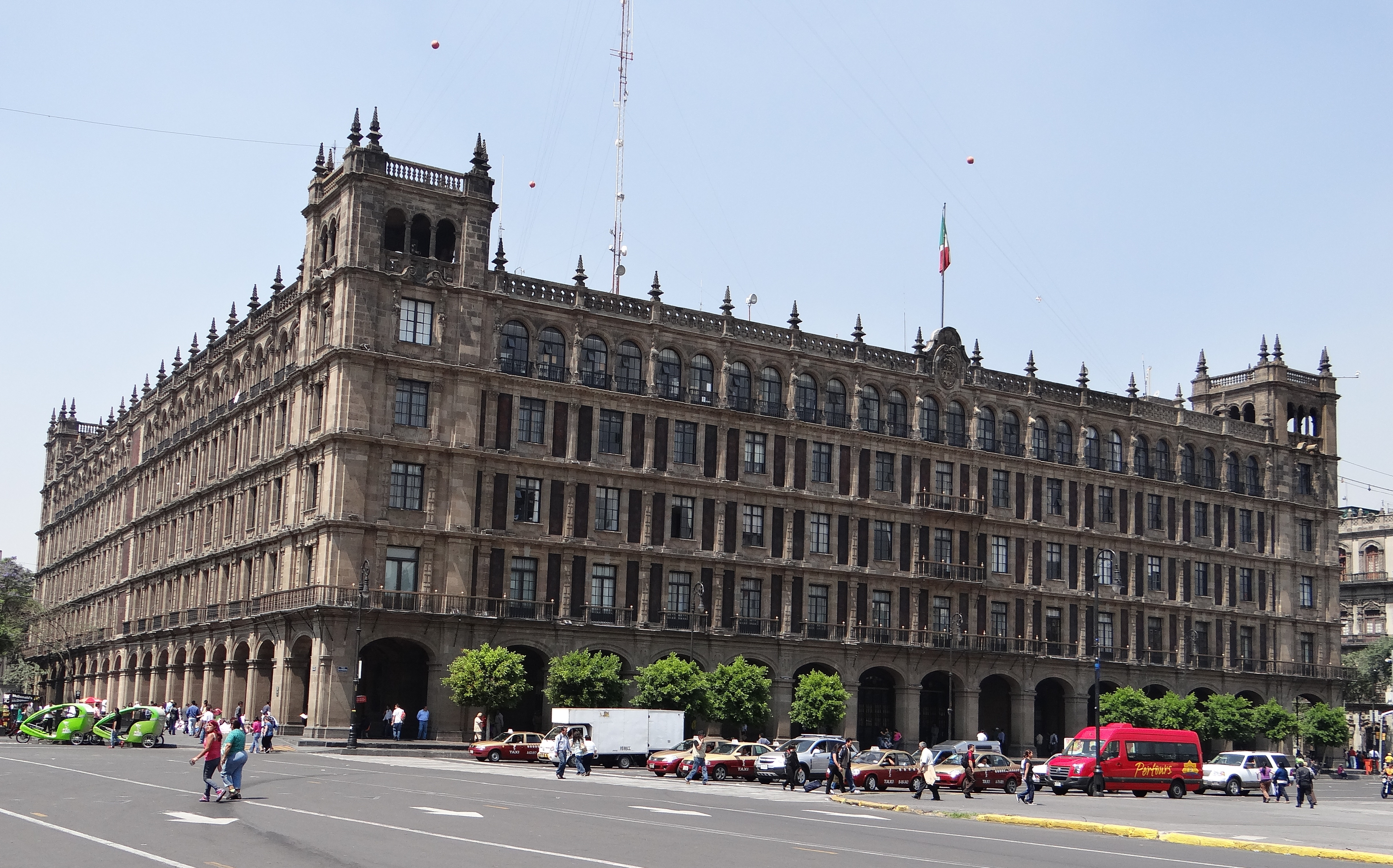
The 1941–1948 built "new" Federal District Building

This building is next to the National Palace and the Supreme Court building. After demolition of the old colonial-period Portal de las Flores in 1935, the current structure was built between 1941 and 1948 and designed to fit in with the rest of the architecture of the Zocalo, as well as to be symmetrical with the "old" Palace of the Ayuntamiento next door. The Portal de las Flores (Portal of the Flowers), named so either because its original owner's name was Flores, but since later it housed markets selling fresh flowers, vegetables and fruit from outlying areas, it is commonly held as the origin of the name This Portal was rebuilt in 1724 and remained the site of markets and stores until the 19th century. The 18th-century building was demolished in 1935, helping to open up 20 de Noviembre Street and clearing way for the current building.

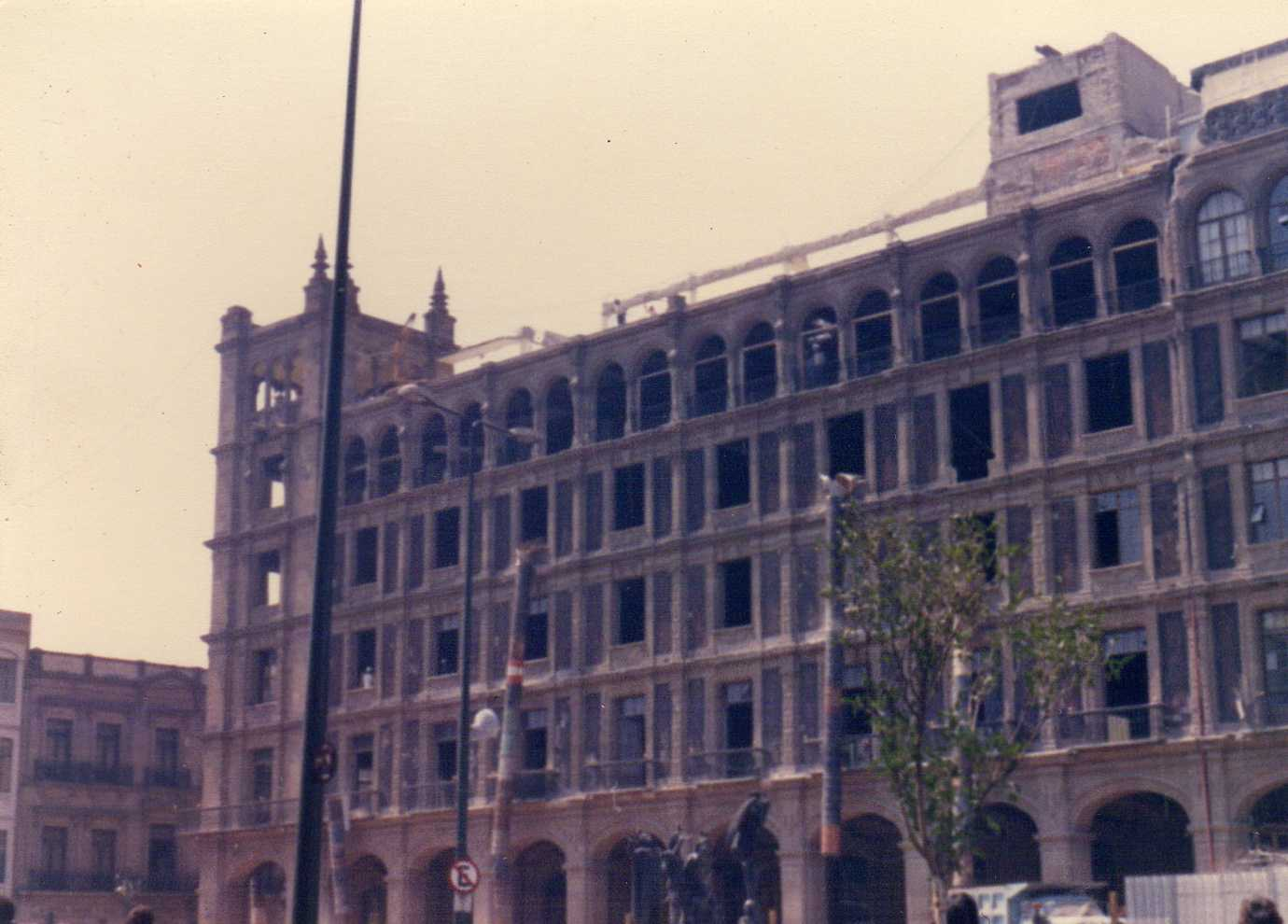
Building damaged after Mexico City 1985 earthquake.

The outside of the building has relatively sober decoration with windows framed in white stone, parapets with windows and square columns. The "mini-balconies" of the windows are done in wrought iron and the corners of the third floor have estipite columns. In 1985 this building suffered damages due to the Mexico City earthquake and was remodeled and restructured. A plaque inside the building commemorate that works.

The interior of the vestibule is simple dominated by the main stairwell. This stairwell contains two large murals depicted the history of Mexico from the pre-Hispanic period to just past the Revolution. Both were painted by Carlos Montuy in 1986 .

When the current edifice was being built, they found the remains of the house of Doña Marina or La Malinche and that of the wife of treasurer Alonso de Estrada. Further down, they found a "tlachtli" or Aztec ball game field, a chacmool and other archeological finds.

== Government offices ==
A number of Federal District department or secretariats are housed in the two buildings. In the original building are housed the "Jefatura de Gobierno" (offices of the Chief of the District), the Secretaría de Gobierno (Secretariat of the Government), and the "Secretaría de Medio Ambiente" (Secretariat of the Environment). In the newer building are housed the "Oficialia Mayor" (Government Oversight), the Secretaría de Desarrollo Social (Secretariat of Social Development), the Secretaría de Obras y Servicios (Secretariat of Works and Services) and the Secretaría de Protección Civil (Secretariat of Civil Protection).

== Politics and culture ==
The Chief of the Federal District since 2018 is Claudia Sheinbaum. While the Old Town Hall is overshadowed by the National Palace and Mexico City Cathedral, it has been the scene of some political and social events. In December 2007, microbus operators protested there for a number of days until District Chief Marcelo Ebrard promised to meet with them about their demands for higher tariffs. In the same year, the city sponsored a light show projected onto the side of the building, representing different eras in Mexico City's history. It was called "Mexico DF: una historia en luz" (Mexico, Federal District: a history in light). The show included images and music. President of Spain José Luis Rodríguez Zapatero visited the old Palace in 2007 as well, praising Mexico City as the vanguard of social change for the country as he was given the keys to the city.
