= Statue of Heydar Aliyev, Mexico City =

Statue formerly displayed in Mexico City

Statue of Heydar Aliyev
- Estatua de Heydar Alíyev (Spanish), Heydər Əliyevin heykəli (Azerbaijani)
- The statue in 2012
- Former location in Mexico City
- Medium: Bronze
- Subject: Heydar Aliyev
- Dimensions: 3.60 m (11.81 ft)
- Condition: Removed
- Location: Mexico City, Mexico; 19.4242°N 99.1794°W

The statue of Heydar Aliyev (Note: Spanish: Estatua de Heydar Alíyev; Azerbaijani: Heydər Əliyevin heykəli.) is a bronze sculpture of the third president of Azerbaijan, Heydar Aliyev, previously installed along Paseo de la Reforma, in Chapultepec, Miguel Hidalgo, Mexico City. It has been removed after drawing mass criticism from human rights activists.

In the early 2010s, the Embassy of Azerbaijan in Mexico donated two statues to the city. The first was the statue of Aliyev, installed on 22 August 2012 in Mexico-Azerbaijan Friendship Park in Chapultepec. The second, a woman mourning the Khojaly massacre, was placed in Tlaxcoaque Plaza. According to Ilgar Mukhtarov, Azerbaijan's ambassador to Mexico, both statues were given to the country as a gesture of gratitude to Mexico for being one of the first countries to recognize Azerbaijan's independence.

After its installation, the statue of Aliyev drew criticism from neighbors and human rights activists, who considered it disrespectful and insensitive due to his controversial political background. Members of the Azerbaijani community, however, expressed support for the monument. On 26 January 2013, the government of Mexico City removed the statue and returned it to the Azerbaijani embassy. Since then, the location and status of the statue have not been publicly disclosed.

== Description and installation ==
Heydar Aliyev was an Azerbaijani politician who served as president of Azerbaijan between 1993 and 2003. Aliyev has been criticized internationally, being described as an "iron fist" leader, "dictator", and "authoritarian".

According to Ilgar Mukhtarov, Azerbaijan's ambassador to Mexico, negotiations for the sculptural project began in 2008, though it was not until 2010 that they were formalized. He stated that the initiative aimed to show appreciation to Mexico for being one of the first countries to recognize Azerbaijan's independence. On 13 July 2011, both nations signed an agreement to start the project. In the same month, it was endorsed by the Citizens' Governing Council of Chapultepec Park (Spanish: Consejo Rector Ciudadano del Bosque de Chapultepec; CRC). However, during the controversy around the statue, members of the panel later said they were ignorant to the abuses attributed to Aliyev. Committee member Monica del Villar said the proposal "presented to us was completely different from what they built."

The designated area was named "Mexico-Azerbaijan Friendship Park" (Spanish: Parque de la Amistad México-Azerbaiyán), and was located along Paseo de la Reforma, on the edge of Chapultepec. The area covers 1,700 square meters (18,000 sq ft), and it is illuminated with solar street lights. Construction began in April 2012. The statue was donated by the Azerbaijani embassy in Mexico, stands 3.6 meters (12 ft), and was shipped from Azerbaijan.

On 22 August 2012, Marcelo Ebrard, then head of government of Mexico City, inaugurated the project. Tracy Wilkinson of the Los Angeles Times criticized the memorial, first describing it as "Aliyev [sitting] on a white marble pedestal [with] his name embossed in golden letters", placed "in front of a jagged stone map of Azerbaijan", taking note of their failure to mention its ranking as "one of the most corrupt countries". The map is almost 8 meters (26 ft) tall. Will Grant of BBC News described that a plaque referred to Aliyev as "a great politician and statesman", and criticized the Azerbaijani embassy of employing "Stalinesque control".

=== Khojaly massacre memorial ===
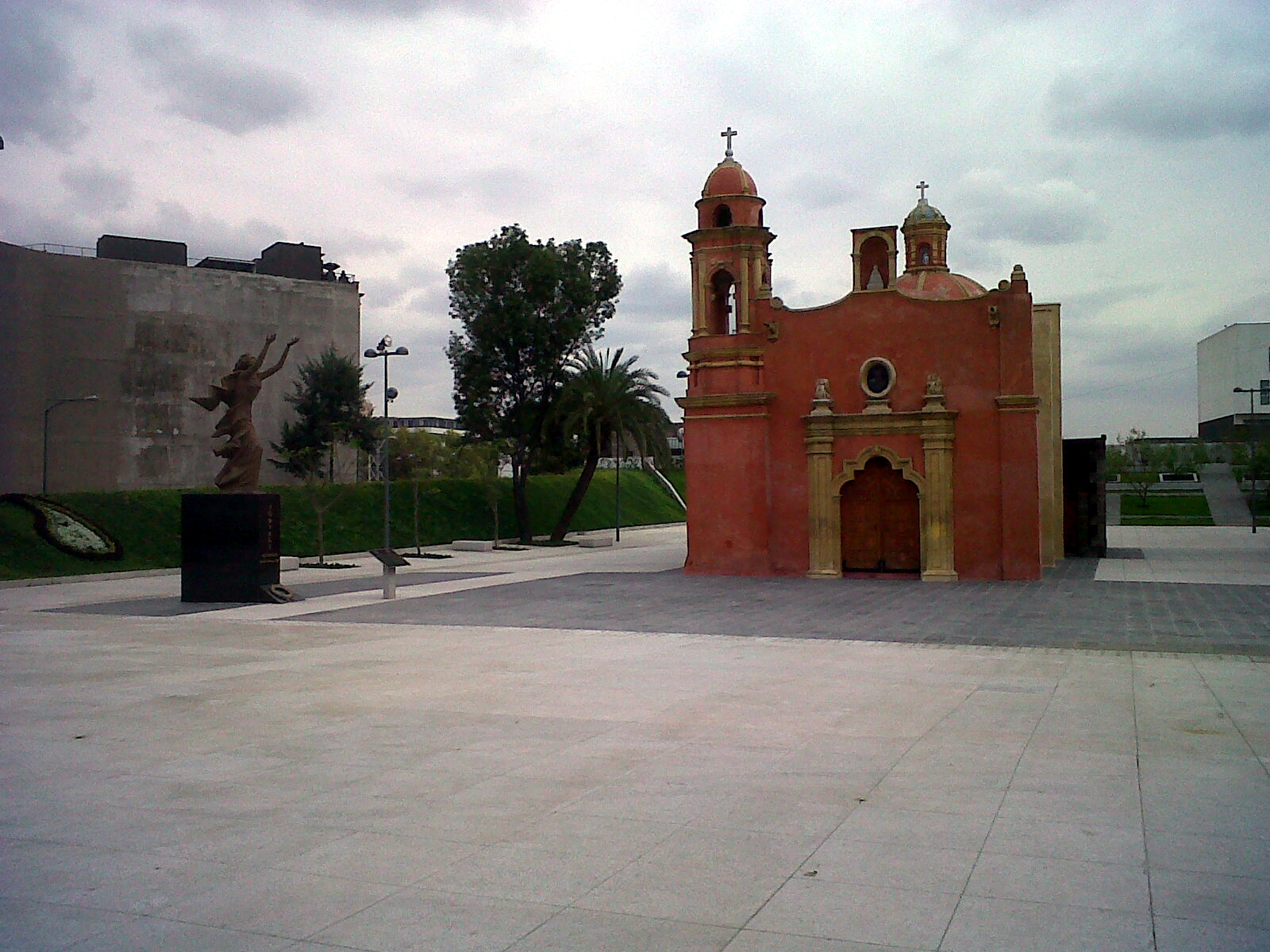
The embassy of Azerbaijan in Mexico donated the statue in Tlaxcoaque Plaza (pictured in 2012)

Additionally, the embassy donated a second statue, which was installed in Tlaxcoaque Plaza. The accompanying plaque originally described the Khojaly massacre as a "genocide", though it was later revised to read "massacre". The embassy also donated approximately Mex$65 million (around five to six million US dollars) (Note: Other sources estimate the investment at between 40 and 100 million pesos (between 3 and 10 million US dollars).) which were allocated for improvements to Friendship Park and Tlaxcoaque Plaza. According to Mukhtarov, the embassy did not transfer funds directly to the city government but instead paid private construction firms to carry out the work.

== Reception ==
By November 2011, after conducting further research on Aliyev, the CRC withdrew its endorsement and requested that the city government reconsider the installation of the statue. According to Mexican writer and former CRC member Denise Dresser, "[after requesting them to reconsider it,] they thought we were making a mountain out of a molehill [...] They were clueless and they were ignorant, and we alerted them to the fact that they were clueless and ignorant."

Controversy started by early September 2012. On 27 September, residents of Chapultepec protested the statue's installation, calling it "disrespectful and insensitive". Eduardo Farah, a community activist, led a small demonstration consisting of 20 people, where they waved banners calling for "the removal of the dictator". The National Human Rights Commission recommended its removal. Elnur Majidli, organizer of the 2011 Azerbaijani protests, also criticized the project, saying that corruption was involved "necessarily" in the project. Alexander Lapshin, a journalist that was arrested by Azerbaijani authorities due to a visit to Nagorno-Karabakh, compared the statue's installation to Mexico erecting a monument to a drug lord. Cuauhtémoc Cárdenas, then serving as Mexico City's international affairs coordinator, commented that it "does not honor Mexico City, and Mexico City does not have any reason to honor him".

In October, Eduard Nalbandyan, then-Ministry of Foreign Affairs of Armenia, expressed concern to Patricia Espinosa, then-Secretary of Foreign Affairs of Mexico, regarding the statue of Aliyev and the classification of the Khojaly massacre as "genocide", which conflicted with the position of the OSCE Minsk Group. Armenia and Azerbaijan have been in a longstanding geopolitical conflict over Nagorno-Karabakh since the October Revolution of 1917 and do not maintain diplomatic relations.

Mukhtarov said the information concerning Aliyev was "erroneous and manipulated by the Armenian opposition", adding that Aliyev "abolished capital punishment and promoted policies that improved Azerbaijan's economy". On 27 November 2012, 30 Azeri protesters based in Mexico called for the statue to remain in place.

== Removal ==
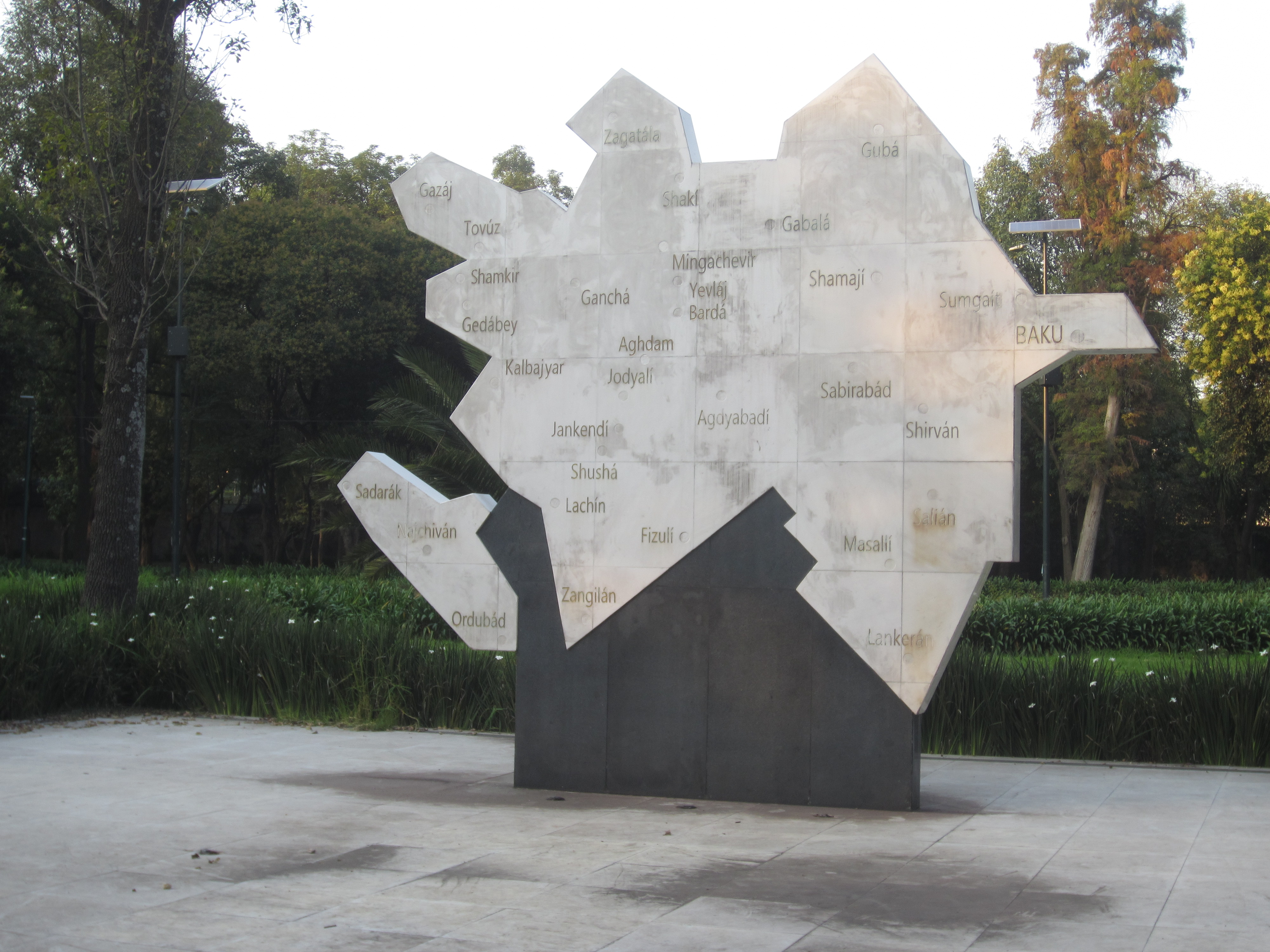
Former location of the statue in 2018, showing the stone map of Azerbaijan still standing in the park.

On 22 October, a special commission was created to determine the statue's future. In January 2013, the group recommended its removal. Five months after its installation, the sculpture was removed by Mexico City authorities during the early morning of 26 January. The city had previously signed an agreement to keep the statue in place for 99 years. It was transported to a warehouse of the Urban Development and Housing Secretariat, located at Camarones Avenue and Eloudy Street, in the colonia ("neighborhood") of Del Recreo of the Azcapotzalco borough. Joshua Kucera described the place as "strewn with debris and stacks of bricks", calling it an "ignominious fate" for Aliyev.

Manuel Luna, private secretary to Mukhtarov, said the embassy of Azerbaijan was never notified about the removal. The embassy later asked the city government to return the sculpture. Salvador Campos, former Mexican ambassador to Azerbaijan and Turkey, considered the problem stemmed from Mexico City’s failure to consult the federal Secretariat of Foreign Affairs. As a consequence, Azerbaijan withdrew US$3.8 billion in planned investments, which were intended for building oil refineries and improving public spaces in Mexico.

As of November 2013, the statue was placed in a private home in the colonia of Lomas de Chapultepec. In January 2015, the government of Mexico City donated to the embassy of Azerbaijan a property along Paseo de la Reforma in Lomas de Chapultepec. In response to the controversy, the Committee for Monuments and Artistic Works in Public Spaces (Comité de Monumentos y Obras Artísticas en Espacios Públicos, COMAEP) was established to prevent similar incidents in the city's future.
