= Ciclovía La Gran Tenochtitlán =

Bikeway in Mexico City

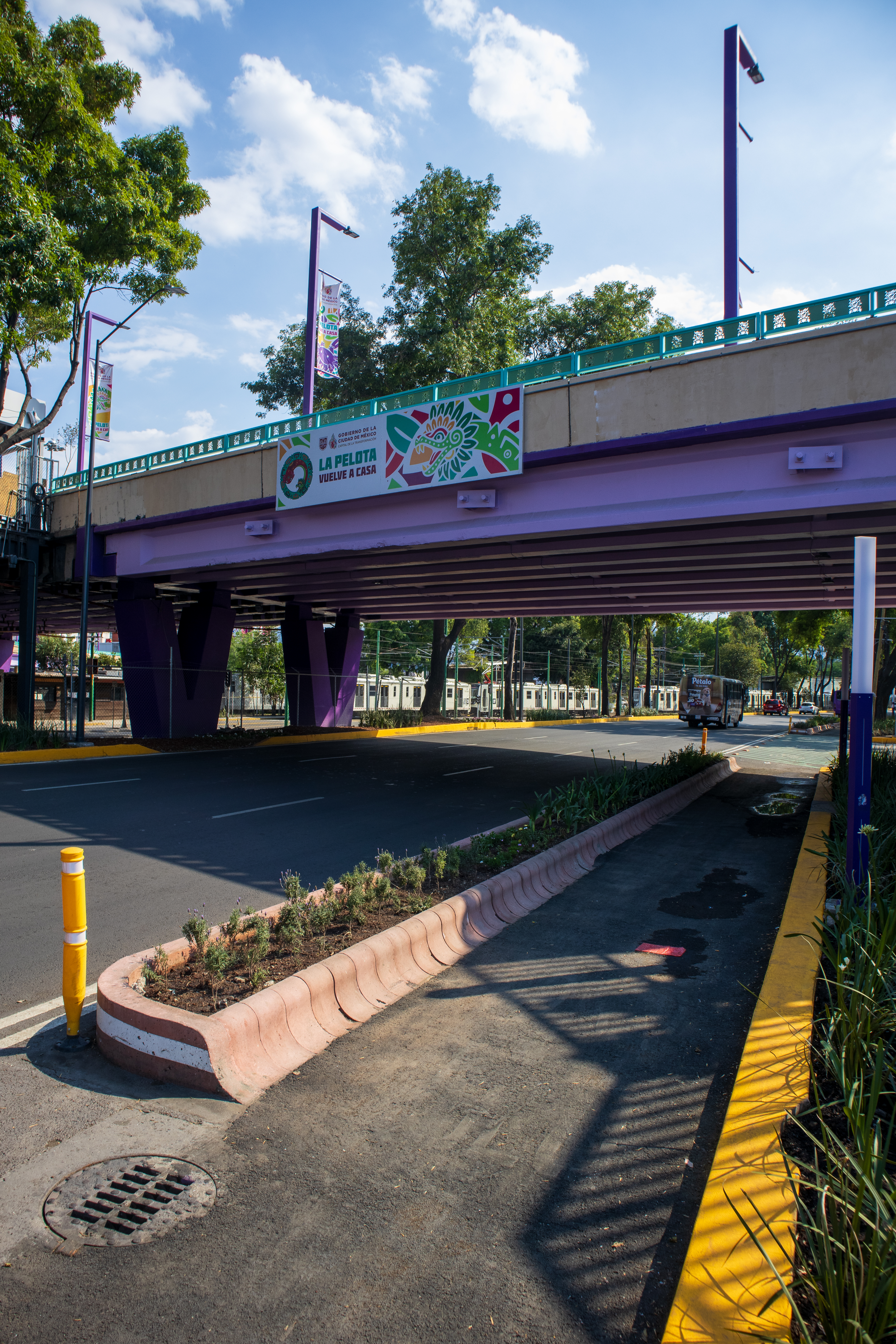
The bikeway near Estadio Azteca

The Ciclovía La Gran Tenochtitlán is a bikeway in central Mexico City. It runs 34 kilometers (21 mi) along Calzada de Tlalpan, a major north–south thoroughfare, starting at Plaza Tlaxcoaque, in the historic center of the city, toward Estadio Azteca area. The bikeway was announced in June 2025 by the head of government of Mexico City, Clara Brugada, ahead the 2026 FIFA World Cup, a football tournament co-hosted by Mexico.

Although incomplete, the bikeway was inaugurated on 19 April 2026. In her remarks at the inauguration event, Brugada highlighted its connection with multiple Mexico City Metro stations. In the section that comprises San Antonio Abad and Chabacano metro stations, the bikeway connects to the Jardín Flotante Tlallipan (alternatively known as Calzada Flotante Tlallipan), a pedestrian bridge that crosses above the tracks of Line 2 of the Mexico City Metro.

The project has drawn criticism due to its design, planification, cost, and zoning, and it was concluded days after the tournament's final match was played.

== Overview ==
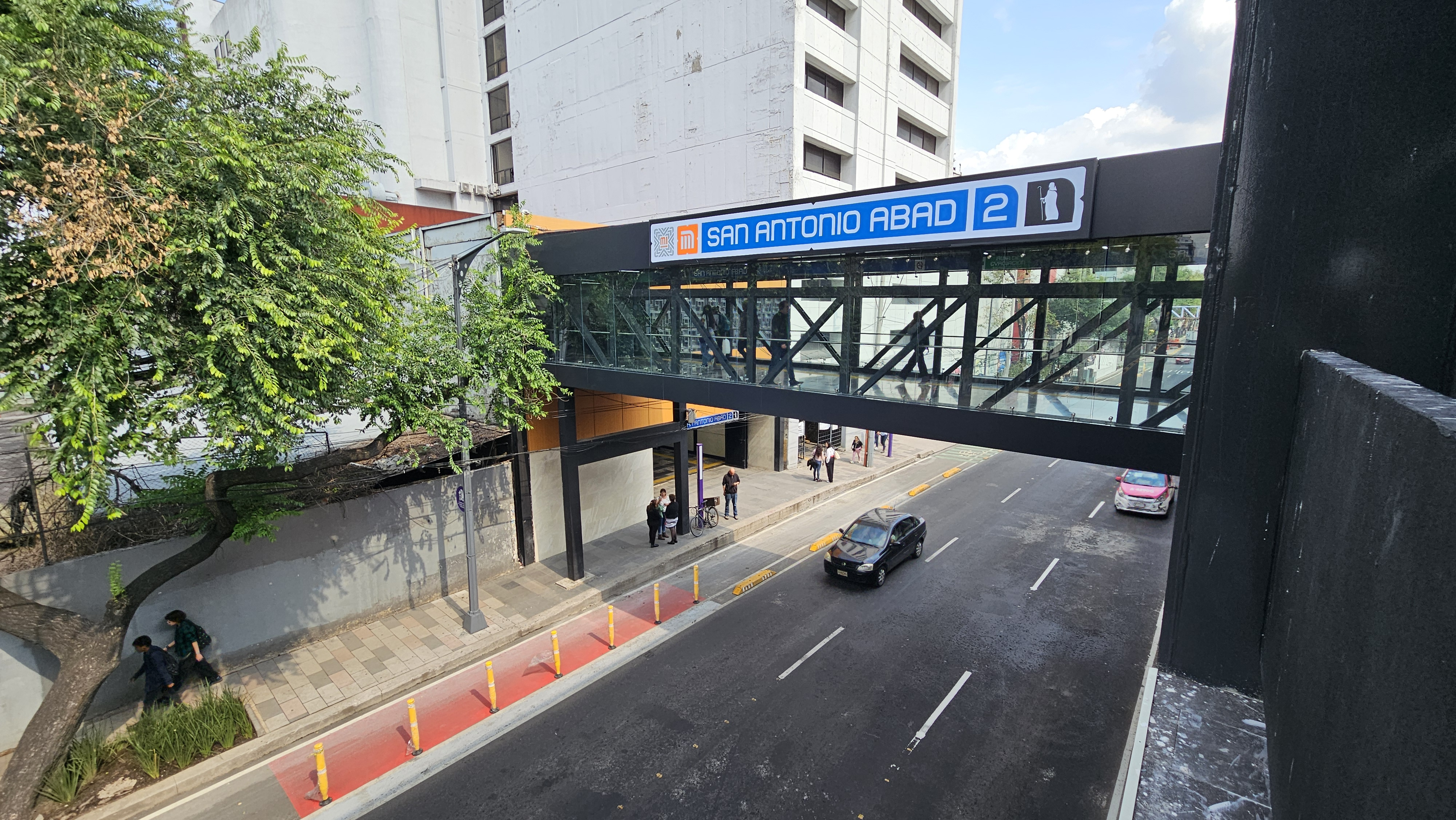
The bikeway as seen from the adjacent overpass

The Ciclovía La Gran Tenochtitlán was announced on 3 June 2025 by the head of government of Mexico City, Clara Brugada. It is divided in two sections. From Tlaxcoaque, near Pino Suárez metro station, to Chabacano metro station, it runs along Calzada de Tlalpan with connections to a 1.8-kilometer (1.1 mi) overpass, which serves as a pedestrian park. It is named Jardín Flotante Tlallipan, and was inaugurated incomplete on 7 June 2026.

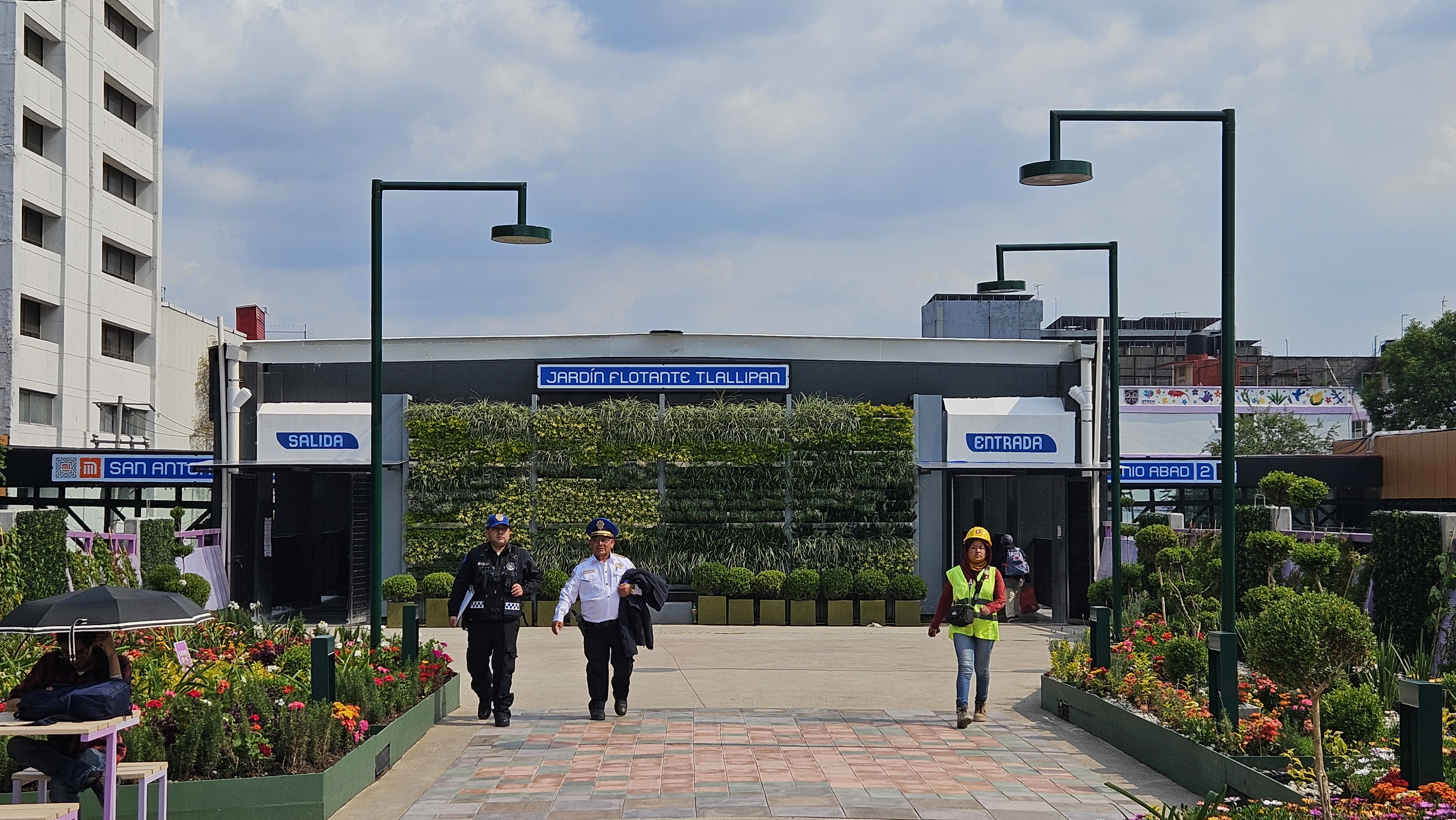
Metro access to the Jardín Flotante Tlallipan

Its second section, which begins at Chabacano metro station, runs at grade as a side bike lane toward CETRAM Huipulco, near Estadio Azteca. It was inaugurated incomplete on 19 April 2026. In her remarks at the inauguration event, Brugada highlighted its connection with multiple Mexico City Metro stations.

The Ciclovía La Gran Tenochtitlán cost Mex$186,667,857. According to the construction contract, the project was carried out by seven companies, which were required to complete it by November 2025. The Calzada Flotante Tlallipan ultimately cost Mex$2,002,399,003.70, compared with an original projected cost of Mex$659,000,000.

Following the 2026 FIFA World Cup final, the project remained under construction. It was concluded on 26 July 2026.

== Reception ==
=== Criticism ===
The bikeway received criticism from residents because it is intended for tourists ahead of the 2026 FIFA World Cup soccer games, with some sectors of the population calling it "social cleansing", and sex workers stating that it has displaced them, as Calzada de Tlalpan is a red-light district. Local vendors estimated a decline in sales during construction. Motorists criticized the reduction by two lanes for the construction, which would cause traffic congestion. A skatepark was demolished amid criticism from skaters, who questioned the preference given to one sport over the other.

San Antonio Abad metro station had to be rebuilt because of the bridge. The Mexico City Metro labor union questioned the project, describing it as "cosmetic", indicating that tourists will not primarily visit Estadio Azteca by bicycle, and stating that it would eventually lead to subsidence, leaks, seepage, and damage to tracks and infrastructure of Line 2.

== Issues ==
The day the Calzada Flotante Tlalpilli was inaugurated, on 7 June, water pooled on its surface, and water seeped into the San Antonio Abad metro station.
