= Nuevo Mundo (town) =

Coordinates: 18.9936°S 64.2928°W

- Town
- Interactive map of Nuevo Mundo
- Country: Bolivia
- Time zone: UTC-4 (BOT)

Nuevo Mundo is a small town in Bolivia.
