= Iglesia de San Bernardo, Mexico City =

Coordinates: 19°25′50.81″N 99°8′1.88″W

Church of San Bernardo
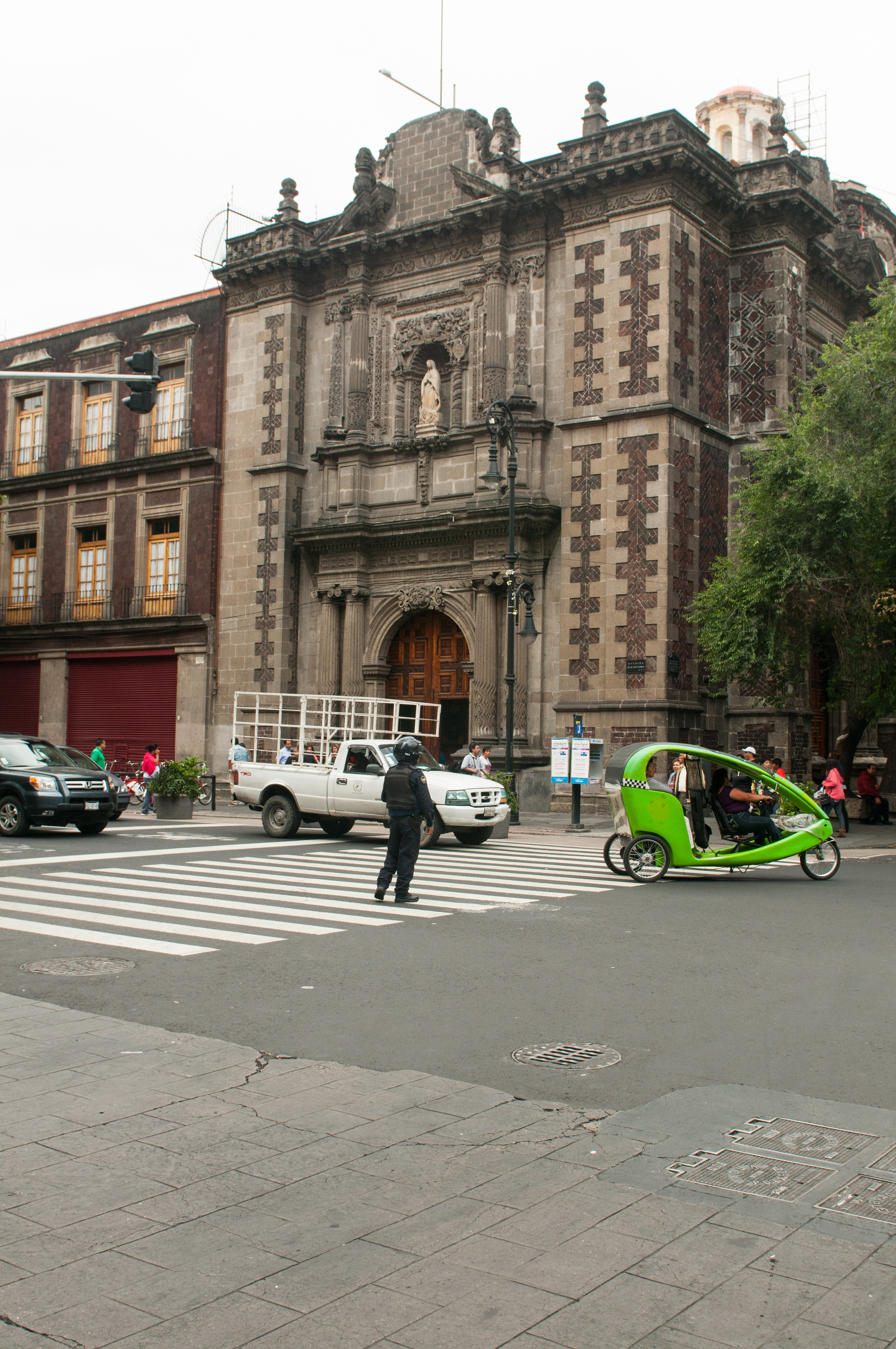
- Church of San Bernardo in Mexico City
- Church of San Bernardo
- Location: Mexico City
- Country: Mexico
- Denomination: Roman Catholic
- Religious institute: Cistercians

History
- Consecrated: 1690

Architecture
- Architect: Juan de Zepeda
- Style: Baroque
- Groundbreaking: 1685
- Completed: 1687

The Church of San Bernardo (Spanish: Iglesia de San Bernardo) stands at the corner of Avenida 20 de Noviembre and Venustiano Carranza Street just south of the Zocalo or main plaza of Mexico City. It was part of a convent of the same name that was founded in 1636, but was closed along with all convents and monasteries during the La Reforma period in 1861. Currently, only the church remains of the convent complex.

The church was built between 1685 and 1687 in Baroque style.

== Description ==
The church was part of a convent of the same name which was sponsored by Juan Marquez de Orozco, a merchant who left his fortune to the Church with the stipulation that the money be used to found a convent for the Cistercian Order. After Orozo's death, José Retes de Largacha, Marquis of San Jorge, became the convent's benefactor, purchasing the land for the church and convent. The convent was founded in 1636, by three of Orozco's sisters and two other nuns, all from the Convent of Regina Coeli. The church was consecrated in 1690. In the 18th century, Miguel de Berrio y Saldivar, Count of San Mateo Valparaiso, took charge of repair work, leading to the use of geometrically-cut tezontle stone. The church was rededicated in 1777.

During the Reform period under Benito Juárez, all monasteries and convents were closed and this convent was demolished, except for the church. Its demolition paved the way of the opening of the street that would become 20 de Noviembre.

Much of the façade's surface is covered in tezontle a reddish, porous volcanic rock. The decoration of the main façade of the church is what is called a "discreet" expression of the Baroque style, meaning not all of the surface is covered in decoration, but the sections which do have them are done in that style. The work done on this church has been compared to the filigree done by silversmiths. Where the Baroque style really stands out is the profusion of decoration surrounding the niches; one of which holds an image of Saint Bernard and the other a figure of the Virgin of Guadalupe. This figure used to be on the opposite side of the church/convent, but when it was dismantled, it was moved here. The main architect of the church was Juan de Zepeda .

On the exterior is a bronze plaque that reads "Las Religiosas Concepcionistas del Convento del Dulcísimo Nombre de María del Glorioso San Bernardo. Fundado el 30 III 1636 in este Lugar, Celebramos 350 años de su fundación, 1986".

The Church's interior has a neo-classic altar.

== See also ==
- List of colonial churches in Mexico City
