= El Nuevo Mundo =

Mexican department store chain

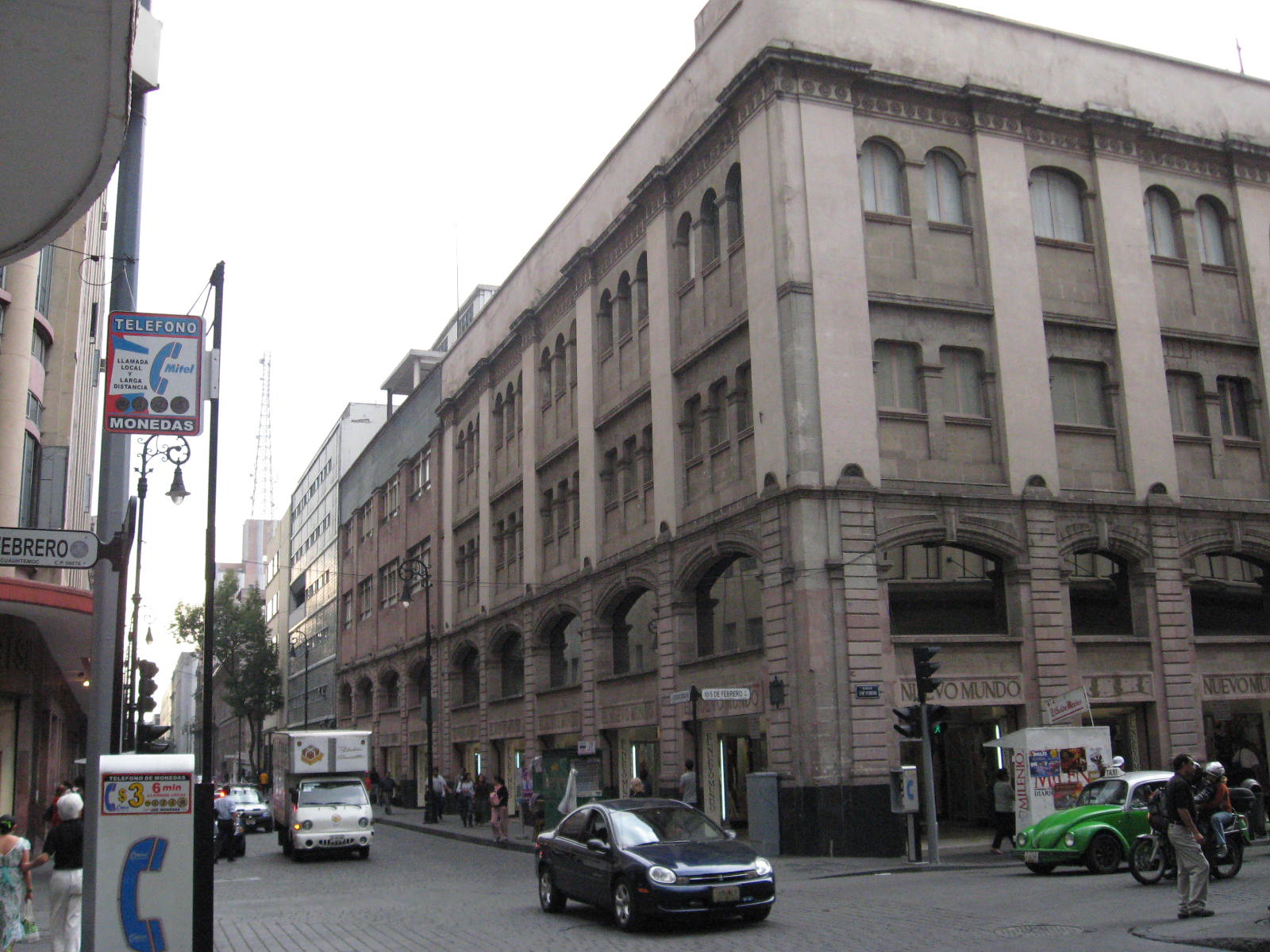
El Nuevo Mundo store in 2008, Historic center of Mexico City

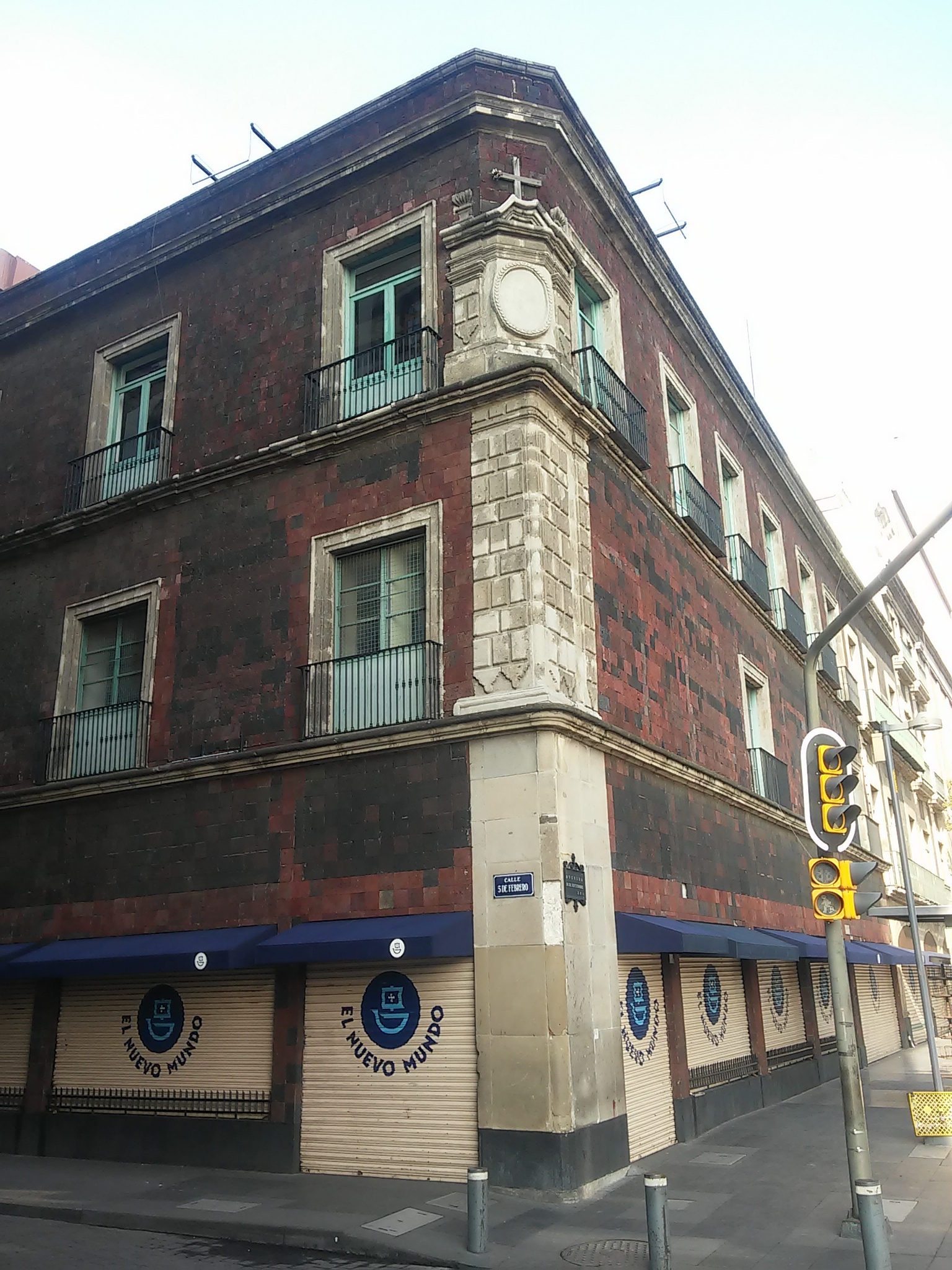
Back side of Mexico City store

El Nuevo Mundo is a Mexican chain of 11 department stores dating back to its first store opened in 1877 in Mexico City.

== History ==
During the mid-1800s in Mexico City, small shops, known as cajones (Spanish: boxes, trunks, drawers), began to appear, selling quality and fashionable clothes and fabrics to the growing Mexican high-end market, which for customers had prior to then meant either traveling to Europe or waiting months for ships from the Old World to arrive with advertised goods. In 1877 the Spaniard Don Bernardo García Robes y Ordoñez founded El Cajón de El Nuevo Mundo Spanish: The Trunk/Box/Drawer of The New World on the corner of Capuchinas and 1st Monterilla, today Venustiano Carranza and 5 de Febrero streets, in the Historic center of Mexico City. The store sold high-quality fabrics, hats and millinery, women's clothing and perfumes imported from Europe, since the Mexican manufacturing industry was just beginning.

In 1910, the year that the Mexican revolution began, the company that became El Nuevo Mundo Mexico S.A. was incorporated. In 1949 the company opened a branch in Guadalajara, branded Almacenes Colón, but changed in 1963 to El Nuevo Mundo Guadalajara. In 1956 it opened a branch in Monterrey on Padre Mier Street which was expanded over time to the current area of 10,000 square meters.

== Products ==
Product lines include apparel and footwear for men, women and children, fabrics, curtains, decoration, household items, home appliances, and haberdashery.

== Stores ==
El Nuevo Mundo stores are located in:

El Nuevo Mundo department stores			Mundara dept. store	Shoe store
Acapulco; Cuernavaca; Guadalajara, Downtown; Mexico City, Historic Center, Venustiano Carranza St.	Monterrey; Downtown Monterrey; San Pedro Garza García; Guadalupe	Veracruz; Querétaro; Tampico	Guadalajara, Plaza del Sol	Monterrey

The chain also has a fabric distribution center.
