= Tlaxcoaque =

Plaza in Mexico City

Coordinates: 19°25′24.58″N 99°8′4.66″W

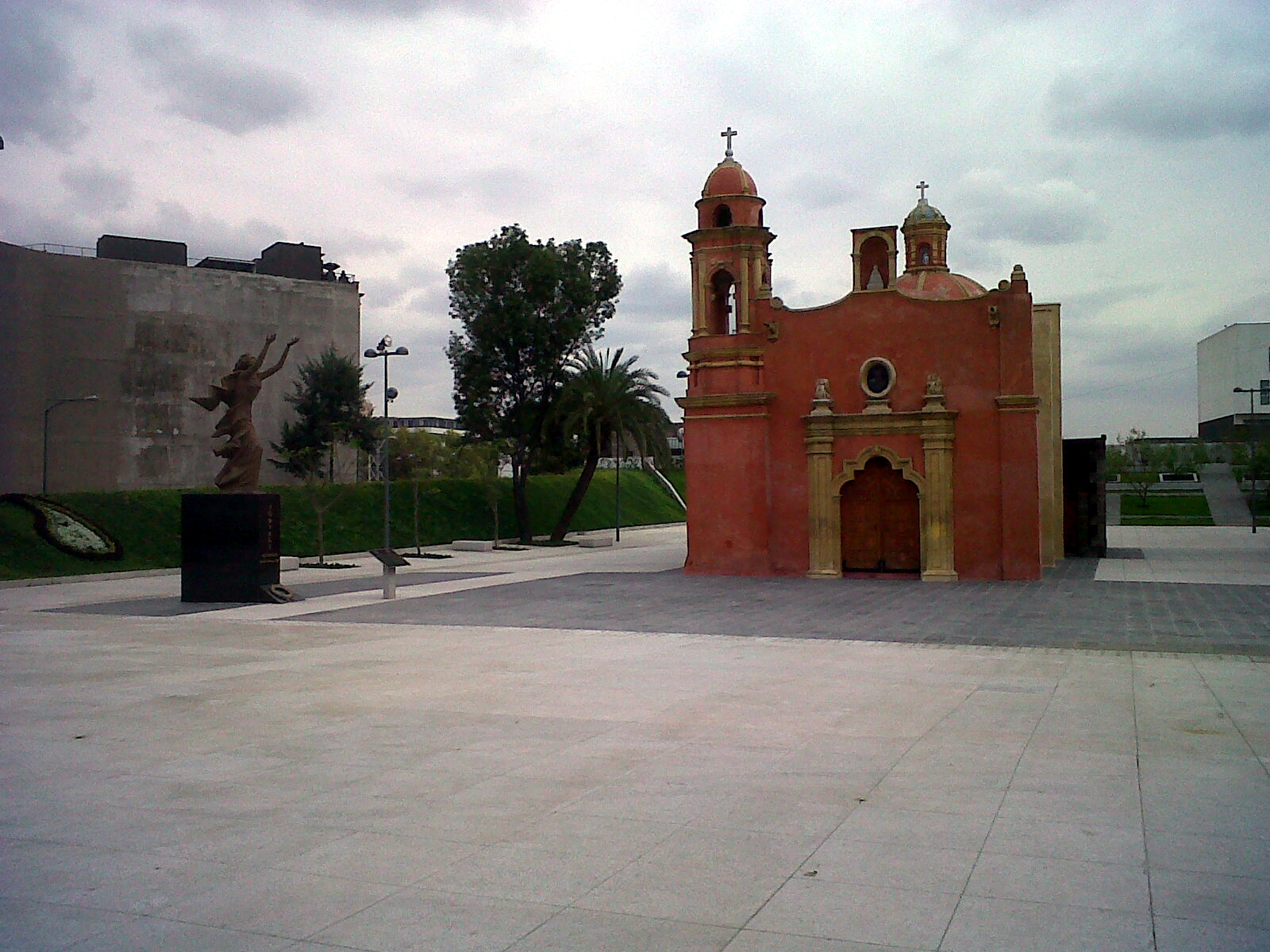
Church and plaza at Tlaxocaque in 2012

Tlaxcoaque is a plaza located in the historic center of Mexico City which has given its name to both the 17th-century church that is on it and the blocks that surround it. Historically this plaza and the church that sits on it have marked the southern edge of Mexico City, and today it is on the border of the historic center and Colonia Obrera. The church and plaza are somewhat isolated from the rest of the center due to the construction of wide streets, such as 20 de Noviembre and Fray Servando Teresa de Mier, that separate them from the surrounding buildings. Another notable building in this area is the police surveillance station, which was infamous in the 1970s as a place where detainees were tortured. This stopped after the 1985 Mexico City earthquake exposed handcuffed bodies which had evidence of torture on them. Today, the area around this plaza is semi-deserted outside of work hours and is considered to be a high-crime area. The church itself has experienced break-ins.

== The chapel ==
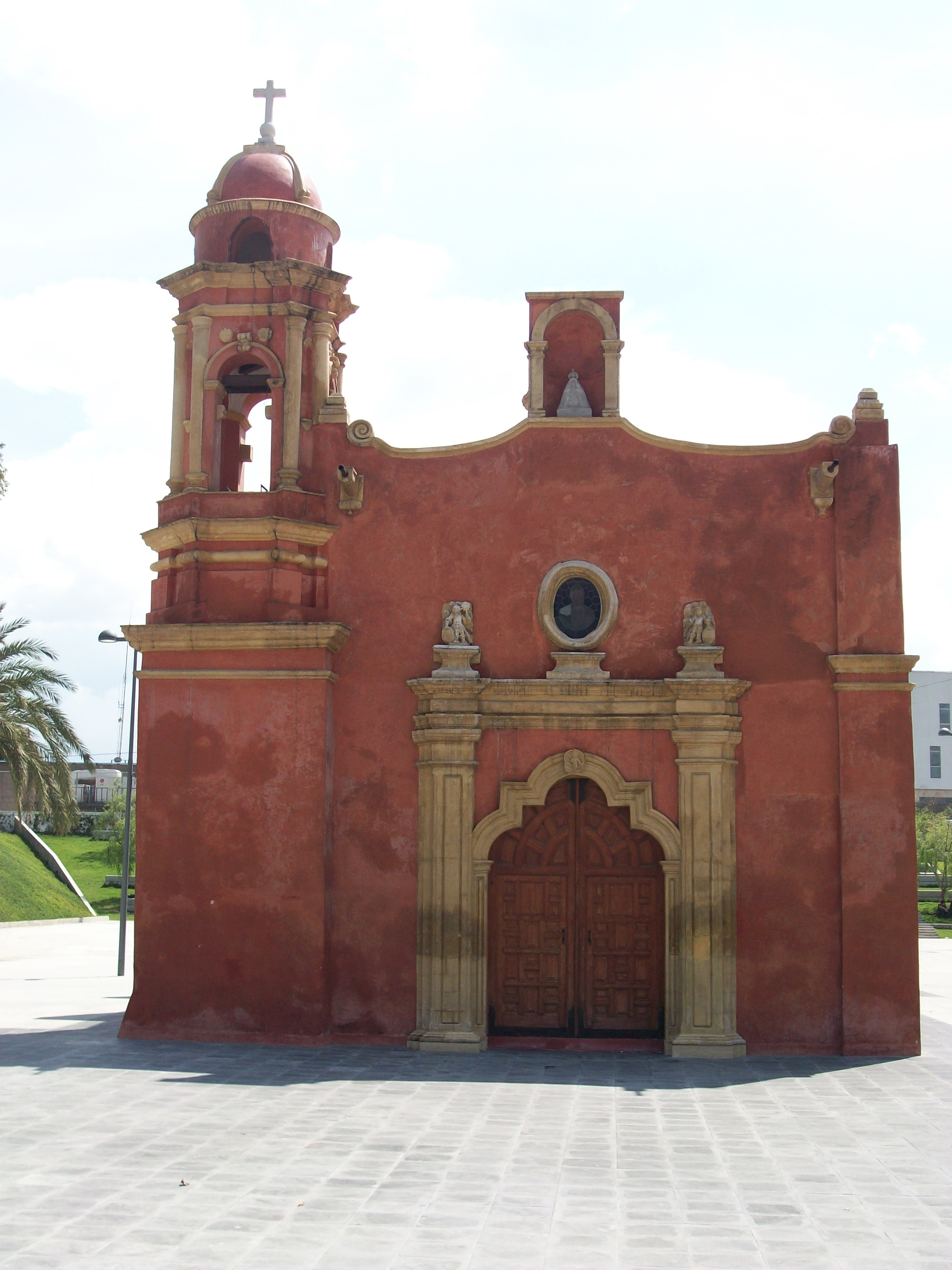
The chapel

Plaza Tlaxcoaque with its small chapel was constructed in the 17th century. It marks the beginning of 20 de Noviembre Avenue, which was built in 1936 to commemorate the 26th anniversary of the armed uprising of Francisco I. Madero in 1910. From Tlaxocaque, one can see all the way to the Zocalo. The plaza has been traditionally considered to be the south entrance to the historic center of Mexico City and for much of the city's history, this place marked the southern border. Today, it is on the border of the historic center and Colonia Obrera.

At the center of the plaza is the Chapel of the Immaculate Conception of Tlaxcoaque. It was constructed in the 17th century of tezontle stone and quarried sandstone. At one time, this church held the remains of Hernán Cortés. The chapel contains arches of sandstone and figures of indigenous angels. On the main altar is an image of the Immaculate Conception, dressed in blue and white flanked by an image of the Sacred Heart and of Saint Joseph. The church and plaza are now isolated from the rest of the historic center due in part to the construction of 20 de Noviembre Street, which destroyed the nearby parts of the Hospital de Jesús Nazareno and convent of San Bernardo. It is now immediately surrounded by the wide streets of Chimalpopoca, 20 de Noviembre, Fray Servando Teresa de Mier and San Antonio Abad, with an underground parking facility underneath the building. The chapel was declared a historic monument on 9 February 1931. In 2001, the church was broken into three times and robbed. The break ins cause significant damage to the old wooden doors of the church as well as the loss of monies and several religious artifacts including a sculpture of San Caralampio.

== The police station ==
On the corner of 20 de Noviembre and Fray Servando Teresa de Mier streets is the police and emergency services building that was inaugurated in 1957 by President Adolfo Ruiz Cortines and then Police Chief Luis Cueto Ramirez. In the 1970s, it was home to the Dirección de Investigación para la Prevención de la Delincuencia (Direction of Investigation for the Prevention of Crime) y del Servicio Secreto (Secret Service), who had been accused of torturing detainees during interrogations. In the 1985 earthquake, part of this building collapsed, and handcuffed bodies were found which had marks indicated that they had been tortured. When the scandal was exposed and the building was rebuilt, it no longer held these two agencies. The building also housed a Police Museum but since 1985, the museum was closed and the collection has remained in storage. There were plans to reopen the museum at a different location in the late 1980s but this never occurred. Today, it houses the Dirección General de Tránsito y el Centro de Monitoreo de la Secretaría de Seguridad Pública (SSP), which deals mostly with traffic law enforcement and public surveillance. It also houses the ERUM, the major ambulance service for the city and a heliport.

== Crime and redevelopment ==
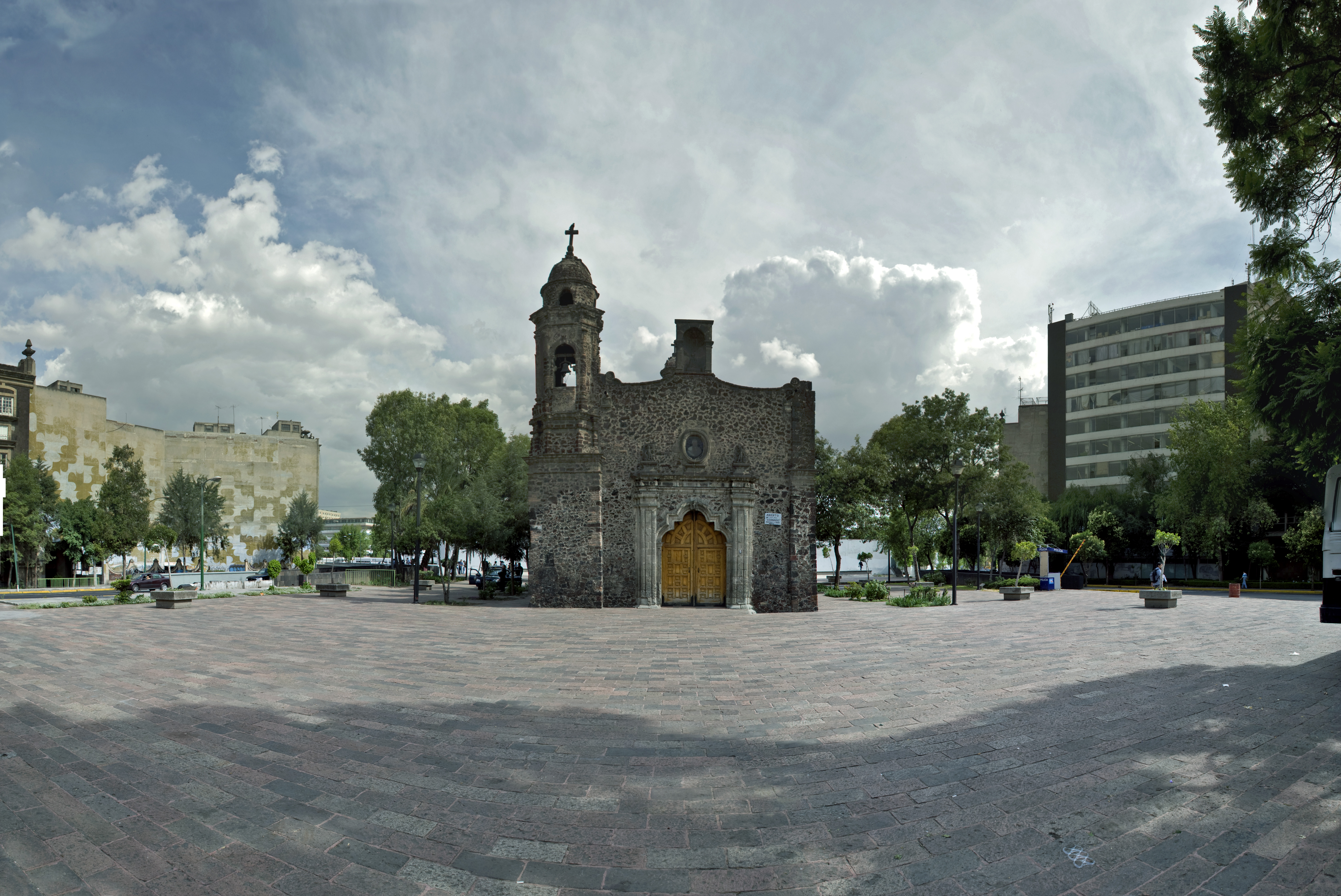
The plaza in 2008, before its renovation

As the area is no longer residential, the streets here become nearly empty from 6pm to the early morning on weekdays and all day on weekends, and during these hours, it is considered to be dangerous. Those who work the night shifts at the ERUM ambulance service state that they do not come to work alone, but always as a group from Metro station Pino Suárez for safety reasons. The area is ranked sixth in delinquent activity in the Cuauhtémoc borough. Tlaxcoaque is also known for semi-permanent street vendors who have become very territorial. Efforts to eliminate street vendors have resulted in threats to public officials, especially those associated with the Secretaría de Seguridad Pública, mostly through anonymous phone calls. This has prompted security details for higher-level administrators and the jailing of several suspects.

One of the reasons for the efforts to clear vendors from here and the rest of the historic center is the 2010 celebrations of the Bicentennial of Mexico's Independence and the Centennial of the Mexican Revolution. Tlaxcoaque was slated for redevelopment, with the police station to be torn down to make way for the Plaza Bicenntenial and the construction of new multifamily housing around the plaza. However, due to financial problems, these plans have been indefinitely suspended.

== See also ==
- Ciclovía La Gran Tenochtitlán
