= Timeline of Mexico City =

The following is a timeline of the history of the city of Mexico City, Mexico.

== Prior to 19th century ==
- 1325 – Tenochtitlán founded by Aztecs.
- 1521 – City captured and sacked by Spanish forces led by Cortés.
- 1522 - National Palace (Mexico) construction starts.
- 1524 – México Tenochtitlán municipality established.
- 1526 - Santo Domingo (Mexico City) established.
- 1527 – Spanish Royal Audiencia of Mexico established.
- 1537 – Mint built.
- 1539 - Printer Juan Pablos active.
- 1543 – Convento Grande de San Francisco painting school established (approximate date).
- 1551 – Royal and Pontifical University of Mexico founded.
- 1573 – Mexico City Metropolitan Cathedral construction starts.
- 1588 – San Ildefonso College founded by Jesuits.
- 1592
  - Consulado established.
  - Alameda Central park created.
- 1629 – Flood.
- 1645 – Metropolitan Cathedral consecrated.
- 1690 – Church of San Bernardo consecrated.
- 1692 – Mexico City Riot of 1692.
- 1720 – Church of La Profesa dedicated.
- 1736 – Palace of the Inquisition built.
- 1752 – Teatro Principal built.
- 1766 – House of the Marquis of Uluapa built.
- 1776 – National Pawn Shop opens.
- 1777 – Sacro y Real Monte Pío de Animas founded.
- 1778
  - Academy of San Carlos founded.
  - La Enseñanza Church consecrated.
- 1785 – Palace of Iturbide (residence) built.
- 1790 – Population: 112,926.
- 1792 – Chamber of Notaries of Mexico City founded.

== 19th century ==
- 1813
  - Mexico City Metropolitan Cathedral construction completed.
  - School of Mines built.
- 1824 – Federal District created.
- 1826 - El Iris literary magazine in publication.
- 1831 - El Cocinero Mexicano (cookbook) published.
- 1833 – National Institute of Geography and Statistics established.
- 1847
  - August 19–20: Battle of Contreras.
  - September 8–15: Battle for Mexico City.
- 1848 – February 2: Treaty of Guadalupe Hidalgo signed, ending the Mexican–American War.
- 1856 - Flood.
- 1863
  - French troops occupied Mexico City.
  - La Merced Market buildings constructed.
- 1864 - Maximilian I of Mexico, archduke of Austria, crowned emperor of Mexico.
- 1865
  - Royal and Pontifical University of Mexico closed.
  - Drogueria de la Profesa (drugstore) in business.
- 1866 – National Conservatory of Music founded.
- 1867 - (2ist of June) Porfirio Díaz takes power.
- 1868 - La Concordia restaurant in business.
- 1875 – Arbeu Theatre opens.
- 1887
  - Fabrica Linera (textile mill) established.
  - Monument to Cuauhtémoc erected.
- 1888 – Posada printer in business.
- 1891 – El Palacio de Hierro (shop) in business.
- 1900
  - Prison built.
  - Population: 344,721.

== 20th century ==
- 1903 – Mexico City Banking Co. established.
- 1905 – General Hospital of Mexico opens.
- 1907 – Post office built.
- 1909 - (30th & 3ist July) Earthquake.
- 1910 –
  - El Àngel monument erected on Paseo de la Reforma.
  - National Autonomous University of Mexico founded, in its modern form.
- 1917 – Excélsior newspaper begins publication.
- 1918 – Teatro Esperanza Iris opens.
- 1919 – Academia Mexicana de la Historia established.
- 1921 – Secretariat of Public Education headquartered in city.
- 1928
  - Federal District of Mexico City divided into 80 boroughs.
  - Teatro Ulises active.
- 1930 – La Aficion newspaper begins publication.
- 1932 – Teatro Orientación founded.
- 1934 – Palacio de Bellas Artes inaugurated.
- 1937
  - Taller de Gráfica Popular established.
  - Hotel Majestic opens in the Portal de Mercaderes.
- 1940
  - 21 August: Leon Trotsky assassinated.
  - Palacio Chino (cinema) opens.
- 1941 – Supreme Court of Justice of the Nation building constructed.
- 1943
  - Colegio Nacional founded.
  - Tepeyac Teatro opens.
- 1945 – Bimbo Bread in business.
- 1947 – Servicio de Transportes Eléctricos begins operation.
- 1948 – New Federal District building constructed.
- 1950 - Population: 2,233,709.
- 1952 – National Auditorium opens.
- 1954 – Ciudad Universitaria campus built in Coyoacán.
- 1957 – July 28: Earthquake.
- 1960 – Cine Latino (cinema) opens.
- 1962
  - Library of the Congress of Mexico established.
  - El Día newspaper begins publication.
- 1964 – Museum of the City of Mexico and National Museum of Anthropology inaugurated.
- 1966 - Estadio Azteca (stadium) opens.
- 1968
  - October 2: Tlatelolco massacre.
  - October: 1968 Summer Olympics held.
- 1969
  - First line of Mexico City Metro (subway system) opens.
  - Sister city relationship established with Los Angeles, USA.
- 1971
  - June 10: Corpus Christi massacre.
  - Polyforum Cultural Siqueiros opens.
- 1978
  - Templo Mayor excavated.
  - Mexico City Philharmonic Orchestra founded.
- 1980
  - Cuestion newspaper begins publication.
  - El Parnaso bookshop in business.
- 1982
  - Central de Abasto (market) built.
  - National Museum of Art opens.
- 1985 – September 19: 1985 Mexico City earthquake.
- 1986
  - Franz Mayer Museum opens.
  - 1986 FIFA World Cup Final held at Estadio Azteca.
- 1990 – Population: 8,235,744; metro 15,047,685.
- 1992 – Supreme Court built.
- 1993 – Cafebrería el Péndulo bookshop/cafe opens.
- 1995 – World Trade Center Mexico City opens.
- 1997 – Cuauhtémoc Cárdenas elected Head of Government of the Federal District.
- 2000 – Andrés Manuel López Obrador becomes Head of Government of the Federal District.

== 21st century ==
- 2001 – Pujol restaurant in business.
- 2003 – Policia de Barrio program established.
- 2004 – Centro Cultural Universitario Tlatelolco established.
- 2005
  - Mexico City Metrobús begins operating.
  - Alejandro Encinas Rodríguez becomes interim Head of Government of the Federal District, succeeded by reinstated Andrés Manuel López Obrador.
- 2006
  - Marcelo Ebrard is elected Head of Government of the Federal District.
  - Centro Cultural Bella Epoca bookshop opens.
- 2008 – November 4: Plane crash in Las Lomas.
- 2010 – Population: 8,851,080; metro: 20,116,842.
- 2012
  - Homeless World Cup football contest held.
  - Mexico City Arena opens.
  - Miguel Ángel Mancera becomes Head of Government of the Federal District.
- 2013 – January 31: Torre Ejecutiva Pemex explosion
- 2018
  - José Ramón Amieva becomes interim Head of Government of the Federal District
  - Claudia Sheinbaum is elected Head of Government of the Federal District
- 2020 – COVID-19 pandemic
- 2020 – Population: 9,209,944; metro: 21,804,515
- 2021 – Mexico City Metro overpass collapse
- 2026 – Hosting FIFA World Cup

== See also ==
- History of Mexico City
- Mexico City's boroughs
- List of heads of government of the Mexican Federal District
- Chronology of the Mexican Federal District (in Spanish)
- Tenochtitlan, 1325-1521
- Greater Mexico City

== Bibliography ==
=== In English ===
==== Published before 20th century ====
- Antonio de Solís; Thomas Townsend (1738). "Description of the City of Mexico". History of the Conquest of Mexico by the Spaniards. Historia de la conquista de Mexico.English.1738. London. hdl:2027/mdp.39015008857297.
- R. H. Bonnycastle (1819). "Metropolis of New Spain". Spanish America. Philadelphia: A. Small. hdl:2027/uc1.b4841339.
- Abraham Rees (1819), "Mexico", The Cyclopaedia, London: Longman, Hurst, Rees, Orme & Brown
- Jedidiah Morse; Richard C. Morse (1823), "Mexico", A New Universal Gazetteer (4th ed.), New Haven: S. Converse
- David Brewster, ed. (1830). "Town of Mexico". Edinburgh Encyclopaedia. Edinburgh: William Blackwood.
- Josiah Conder (1830), "City of Mexico", Mexico and Guatimala, The Modern Traveller, vol. 25, London: J.Duncan
- John Frost (1853), "Mexico", Great Cities of the World in their Glory and in their Desolation, Auburn, New York: Alden, Beardsley & Co.
- Charles Knight, ed. (1866). "Mexico". Geography. English Cyclopaedia. Vol. 3. London: Bradbury, Evans, & Co. hdl:2027/nyp.33433000064802. "Mejico"
- Albert S. Evans (1870), "Mexico", Our Sister Republic: a Gala Trip through Tropical Mexico in 1869-70, Hartford, Connecticut: Columbian Book Co.
- William Eleroy Curtis (1888), "Mexico", The Capitals of Spanish America, New York: Harper & Bros.
- Emil Riedel (1892), Practical guide of the city and valley of Mexico, City of Mexico: I. Epstein, OCLC 9712451, OL 19370863M
- Alfred Ronald Conkling (1893), "City of Mexico and Environs", Appletons' Guide to Mexico, New York: D. Appleton & Company
- Archibald Wilberforce, ed. (1893). "Mexico". Capitals of the Globe. NY: Peter Fenelon Collier. hdl:2027/mdp.39015061863513.
- Henry Moore (1894), "Commercial Directory: Mexico City", Railway Guide of the Republic of Mexico, Springfield, Ohio: Huben & Moore, OCLC 22498265
- "City of Mexico", Vamos á México, Chicago: Southern Pacific Company, 1896

==== Published in 20th century ====
1900s-1950s

- "Mexico City". Chambers's Encyclopaedia. London. 1901.
- Robert South Barrett (1903), Standard guide to the city of Mexico and vicinity, City of Mexico: Modern Mexico, OL 7093895M
- Mexico: the Magazine Guide. Vol. 1. Mexico City: W.J. de Lamater Company. 1907.
- "Mexico: City of Mexico", United States, with Excursions to Mexico, Cuba, Porto Rico, and Alaska (4th ed.), Leipzig: K. Baedeker, 1909, OCLC 02338437
- Reau Campbell (1909), "City of Mexico", Campbell's New Revised Complete Guide and Descriptive Book of Mexico, Chicago: Rogers & Smith Co., OCLC 1667015
- "History and Description: Special Places: Mexico (City and Valley)". List of Works in the New York Public Library Relating to Mexico. New York Public Library. 1909.
- "Mexico City" . Encyclopædia Britannica. Vol. 18 (11th ed.). 1910. pp. 344–347.
- Harold R. Maxson (1920), A Practical Handbook with Useful Information Regarding Mexico City and Vicinity, Mexico City: American Book & Printing Co., OCLC 8753962, OL 7113864M
- "North America's Oldest Metropolis", National Geographic Magazine, vol. 58, Washington, D.C., 1930 (describes Mexico City)

1960s-1990s

- Frieden, Bernard. The search for housing policy in Mexico City. Town Planning Review. 36 (1965)
- "Mexico, the City That Founded a Nation", National Geographic Magazine, vol. 143, Washington, D.C., 1973
- "Mexico City: An Alarming Giant", National Geographic Magazine, vol. 166, Washington, D.C., 1984
- Lourdes Beneria and Martha Roldan. 1987. The Crossroads of Class and Gender: Industrial Homework, Subcontracting, and Household Dynamics in Mexico City. Chicago: University of Chicago Press.
- La Capital: The Biography of Mexico City, Jonathan Kandell. New York: Random House, 1988 ISBN 0-394-540697
- Peter M. Ward (1990). Mexico City: The Production and Reproduction of an Urban Environment. Belhaven Press. ISBN 978-1-85293-041-7.
- José Luis Lezama (1994). "Mexico: Mexico City". In Gerald Michael Greenfield (ed.). Latin American Urbanization: Historical Profiles of Major Cities. Greenwood Press. ISBN 0313259372.
- "Mexico City: Pushing the Limits", National Geographic Magazine, vol. 190, Washington, D.C., 1996 – via Gale
- Diana Davis. Social Construction of Mexico City. Journal of Urban History. 24 (1998), 364-415
- John Fisher (1999), Mexico, Rough Guides (4th ed.), London, p. 267+, OL 24935876M
- Keith Pezzoli (2000). Human Settlements and Planning for Ecological Sustainability: The Case of Mexico City. MIT Press. ISBN 978-0-262-66114-0.

==== Published in 21st century ====
- "Mexico City". Understanding Slums: Case Studies for the Global Report 2003. United Nations Human Settlements Programme and University College London. 2003.
- David Marley (2005), "Mexico City", Historic Cities of the Americas, vol. 1, Santa Barbara, California: ABC-CLIO, pp. 247–266, ISBN 1576070271
- Gustavo G. Garza Merodio (2006). "Technological innovation and the expansion of Mexico City, 1870-1920". Journal of Latin American Geography. 5 (2): 109–126. doi:10.1353/lag.2006.0025. JSTOR 25765142. S2CID 201783423.
- Emily Wakild (2007). "Naturalizing Modernity: Urban Parks, Public Gardens and Drainage Projects in Porfirian Mexico City". Mexican Studies. 23 (1): 101–123. doi:10.1525/msem.2007.23.1.101. JSTOR 10.1525/msem.2007.23.1.101.
- Rubén Gallo [in Spanish], ed. (2009). The Mexico City Reader. Univ of Wisconsin Press. ISBN 978-0-299-19713-1.
- Robert Weis (2009). "Immigrant Entrepreneurs, Bread, and Class Negotiation in Postrevolutionary Mexico City". Mexican Studies. 25: 71–100. doi:10.1525/msem.2009.25.1.71. S2CID 143510225.
- Diane Davis (2010). Urban Leviathan: Mexico City in the Twentieth Century. Temple University Press. ISBN 978-1-4399-0485-5.
- Markus-Michael Müller (2010). "Community Policing in Latin America: Lessons from Mexico City". European Review of Latin American and Caribbean Studies (88): 21–37. JSTOR 25676405.
- Moises Gonzales (2012). "From Myth to Megacity: Transformation of the Urban Landscape of Mexico City". Traditional Dwellings and Settlements Review. 24 (1): 41. JSTOR 41945785.

=== In Spanish ===
- José María Marroquí [in Spanish] (1900). La Ciudad de México (in Spanish). Vol. 1. Tip. y Lit. "La Europea" de J. Aguilar Vera y Ca.
- Artemio de Valle-Arizpe (1939). Historia de la ciudad de México según los relatos de sus cronistas [History of Mexico City according to the accounts of its chroniclers] (in Spanish). México, D.F.: P. Robredo. OCLC 6945299.
- Peter M. Ward (2004). México Megaciudad: Desarrollo y Política, 1970-2002 (in Spanish). Colegio Mexiquense. ISBN 978-970-701-447-3.
