= Convent Church of Nuestra Señora del Carmen, Puebla =

Church in Mexico

Coordinates: 19°2′17″N 98°12′7.5″W

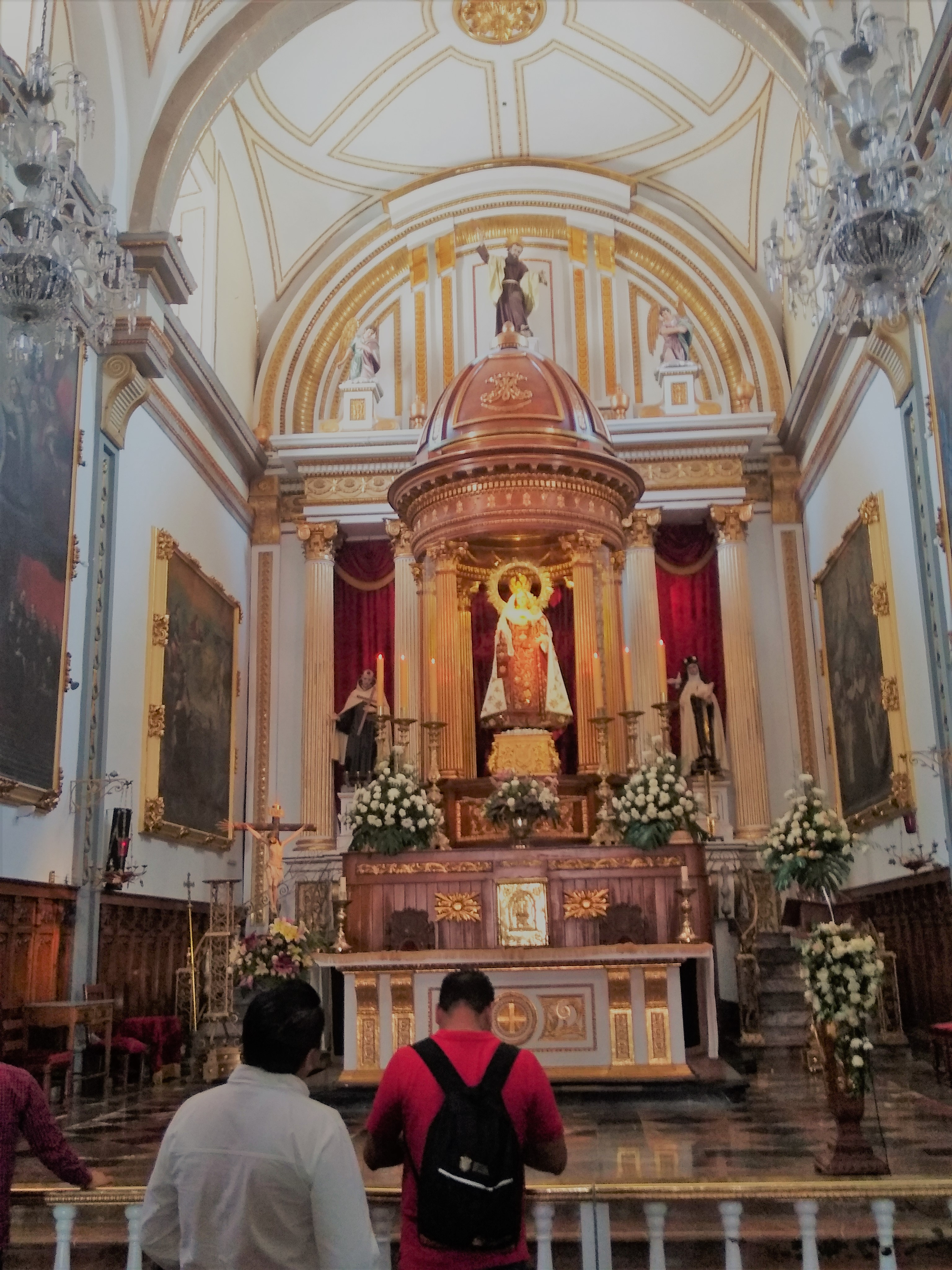

The Conventual Temple of Our Lady of Carmen (Spanish: Templo conventual de Nuestra Señora del Carmen), currently known as the Church of the Virgin of Carmen (Spanish: Iglesia de la virgen del Carmen), is a religious temple of Catholic worship that belongs to the ecclesiastical jurisdiction of the Archdiocese of Puebla de los Ángeles, under the invocation of the Virgen del Carmen. It is an example of the Baroque architecture of Puebla from the early seventeenth century, two of its chapels are of remarkable workmanship and decoration, as is the main nave that contains paintings such as the Santísima Trinidad de Cristóbal de Villalpando and its neoclassical altarpiece that houses the image of the Virgin, the work of the sculptor José Antonio Villegas Cora. The patronal feast is celebrated on July 16.

== History ==
In 1548 the councilor Hernando de Villanueva received a site from the City Council to erect a hermitage dedicated to Our Lady of Remedies. This hermitage was located on the royal road to Atlixco, a road that would eventually become one of the four axes that divided the city of Puebla, the current avenue 16 de Septiembre. The following year, 1549, the hermitage obtained the mercy of another three lots. The tradition according to Cerón Zapata and Mariano Fernández de Echeverría y Veytia refers that the regidor Hernando de Villanueva miraculously recovered after a fight invoking Virgen de los Remedios after which and in gratitude he erected the hermitage by placing her image on the altar. For its better care and assistance, Villanueva gave it in 1552 to the tailors' union, who in turn became a brotherhood two years later. Veytia suggested that the construction of the hermitage may be linked to the celebration of bullfights that were formerly held on the site of the current Plazuela del Carmen.

By 1585 the first Reformed Carmelites of the new Spain arrived, the Discalced Carmelites were the last of the mendicant orders to arrive in Puebla, since the Franciscans, Augustinians and Dominicans had already established themselves in the city. For 1586, Bishop Diego Romano de Tlaxcala (1578-1606) requested the foundation of a convent in the City of Angels, today Puebla, offering for this reason the old hermitage of Nuestra Señora de los Remedios. The remoteness of said sanctuary with respect to the Main Plaza of the city had caused the care in it to be lost, so the Carmelites were requested to attend and safeguard it, who installed their novitiate there around July of that year. Soon, the temple became one of the most sumptuous and important in the city. Bishop Diego Romano then gave them the hermitage of Los Remedios, in charge of the tailors' union, and the council received three more lots, the Carmelites proceeding to build their temple and convent. The foundation was carried out on June 26, 1586, with the license of Felipe II of Spain and the consent of the Viceroy Álvaro de Villa Manrique y Zúñiga, with a certificate signed in San Lorenzo el Real. the dimensions of the convent whose grounds extended to the south for at least four blocks including an independent chapel, and in the then famous pear orchards that appear in the plans of Careaga of 1856 and 1863, Veytia for its part mentions that the religious Carmelites profited from its sale, the fruit of its extensive pear trees originally brought from their farm in the town of San Ángel near Mexico. Hugo Leicht mentions a strange relationship with the etymology of the name "Carmel" in Hebrew "vineyard" of his order and his interest in agriculture, since the Carmelites are credited with the introduction of alfalfa in Puebla, unknown until the end of the 18th century. To ensure the success of their harvests, the orchards received water grants almost from the founding of the convent in 1586, thus they received the precious liquid of sulphurous waters from the so-called eye of the Matadero located on the Paseo Bravo, the waters of the San Pablo eye located more north of the latter and those of a spring that flowed on the slopes of the Cerro de Guadalupe east of the city.

In front of the convent and the atrium on the calle de la Puerta Falsa del Carmen or also called del Arbolito, today September 16 was located the Pantheon of Santa María del Carmelo founded in 1844 by the same Carmelite religious in response to the laws issued since 1827, which prohibited burials inside temples, harmful and unhealthy customs that turned them into "deposits of corruption" that caused epidemics. The same example was followed by the temples of San Francisco in 1848, that of San Antonio the following year and those of La Concordia and La Merced, almost all of them made of drawers or columbariums in imitation of the Roman tombs of the first centuries. The decree of 1826 ordered that the extension of the cemeteries be triple the number of deaths per year, because it took three years for the decomposition of the corpses. By 1878 the use of drawers was prohibited and provisional pantheons were established in the atria of San Sebastián, San Matías, San Miguelito, Santa Ana, Santiago apóstol and San Juan del Río until the appearance of civil pantheons such as the Municipal one. This pantheon, according to a later description, had four corridors that closed it of 83 m. long with 96 gothic columns with their arches inside under which the drawers were arranged, its cover was similar to that of the San Antonio pantheon, also non-existent today. In 1880 the pantheon was closed and it was demolished in 1891 at the same time that the definitive exclaustration of the Carmelites took place. Hugo Leicht in the 30s, describes how the arches and vestiges of the drawers still exist. In the Regional Museum the mummies of a woman and a child that were found in this pantheon are preserved.

== See also ==
- List of buildings in Puebla City
