= Fine Arts Museum of Toluca =

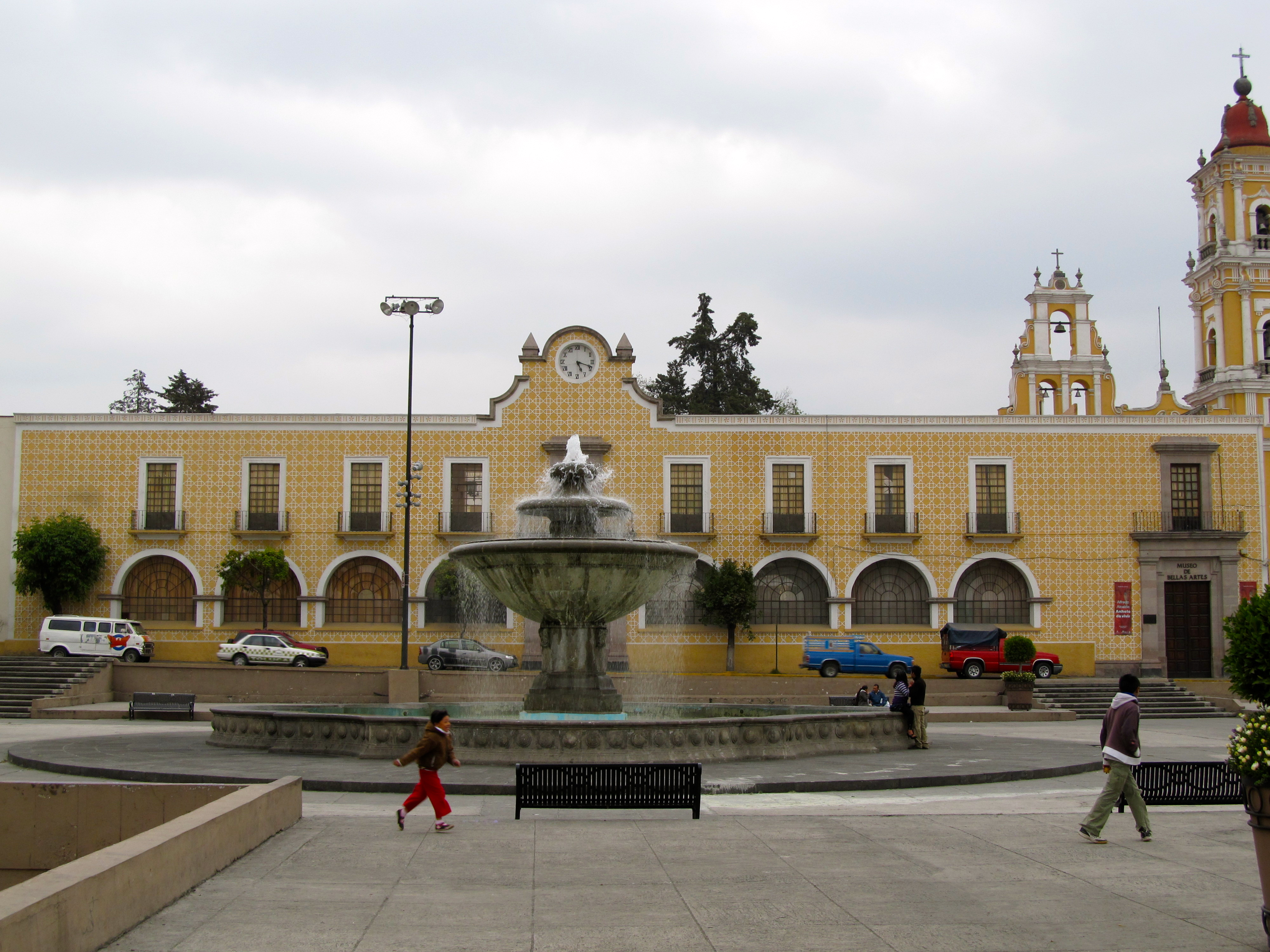
- Established: September 7, 1945; 79 years ago
- Location: Toluca de Lerdo, Mexico
- Coordinates: 19.294359°N 99.656188°W
- Type: Art museum

The Fine Arts Museum of Toluca (Spanish: Museo de Bellas Artes de Toluca) is a museum located in Toluca, Mexico. It is considered one of the most important museums in the State of Mexico for its architectural heritage. It is also one of the oldest museums in the city of Toluca.

== History ==
In 1697, the convent of the Carmelitas Descalzos was built where the museum is located. In 1720, the building was used as a school and later as a hospital. In 1940, it was declared a historical monument by the National Institute of Anthropology and History, the building was used as the headquarters of the Scientific and Literary Institute in the 1960s. In 1944, the state government took control of the building and began a process of restoration of the property. In 1945, the museum was inaugurated. The museum had to go through a restoration process. In 2002, it was reopened. One of the objectives with the creation of the museum was to preserve pieces of art from the 16th to 19th centuries.

== Collections ==
The museum has more than 2,000 pieces of art. The museum contains collections of art by Baroque artists from Jose de Vivar, Miguel Cabrera, Jose Juarez, and Cristóbal de Villalpando. The museum has a collection of wooden sculptures from the 18th century. The museum also contains religious art. Among some of its most important pieces of art is a sculpture of Christ in ivory brought by the Manila galleon.

== Gallery ==
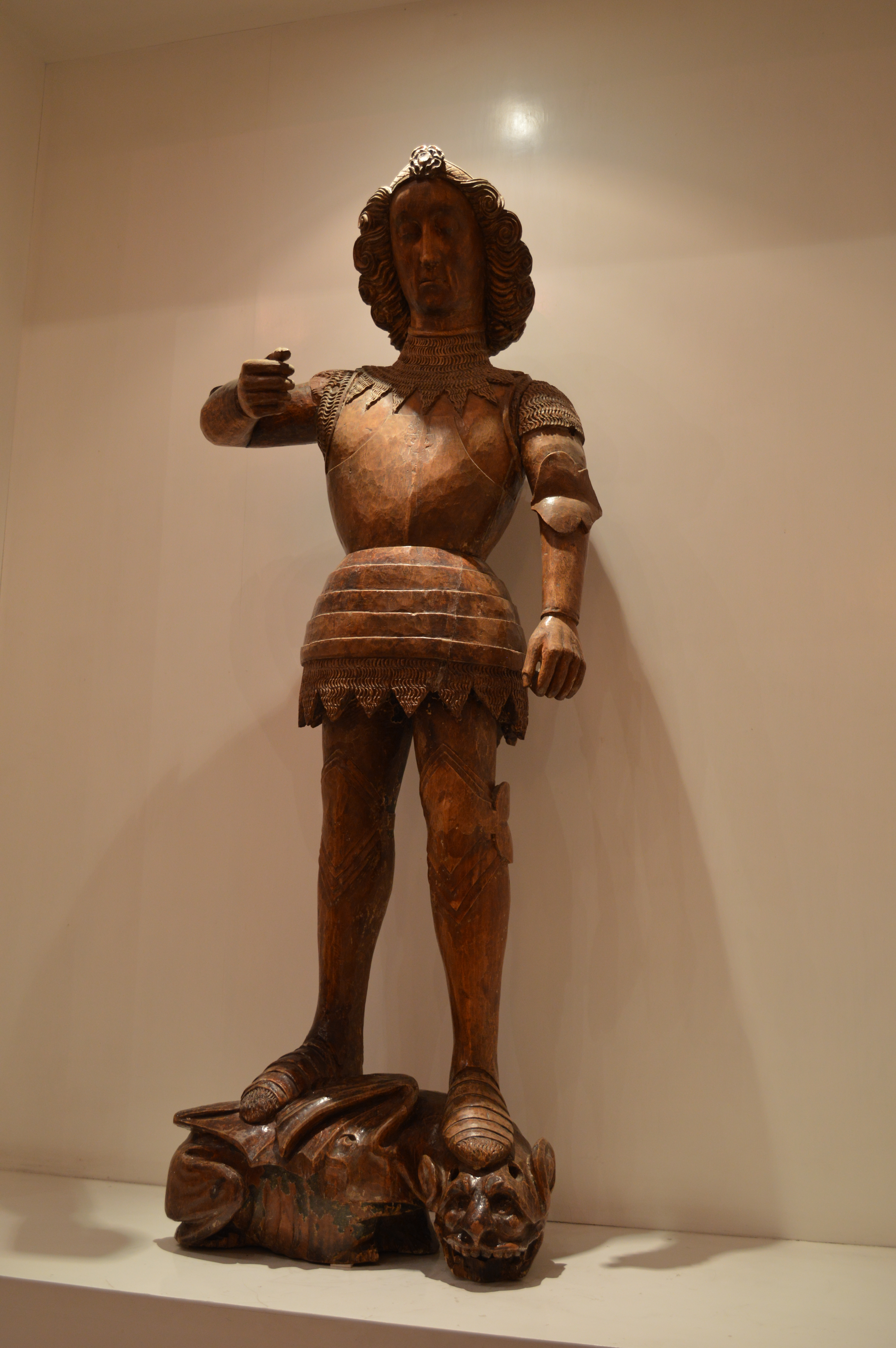

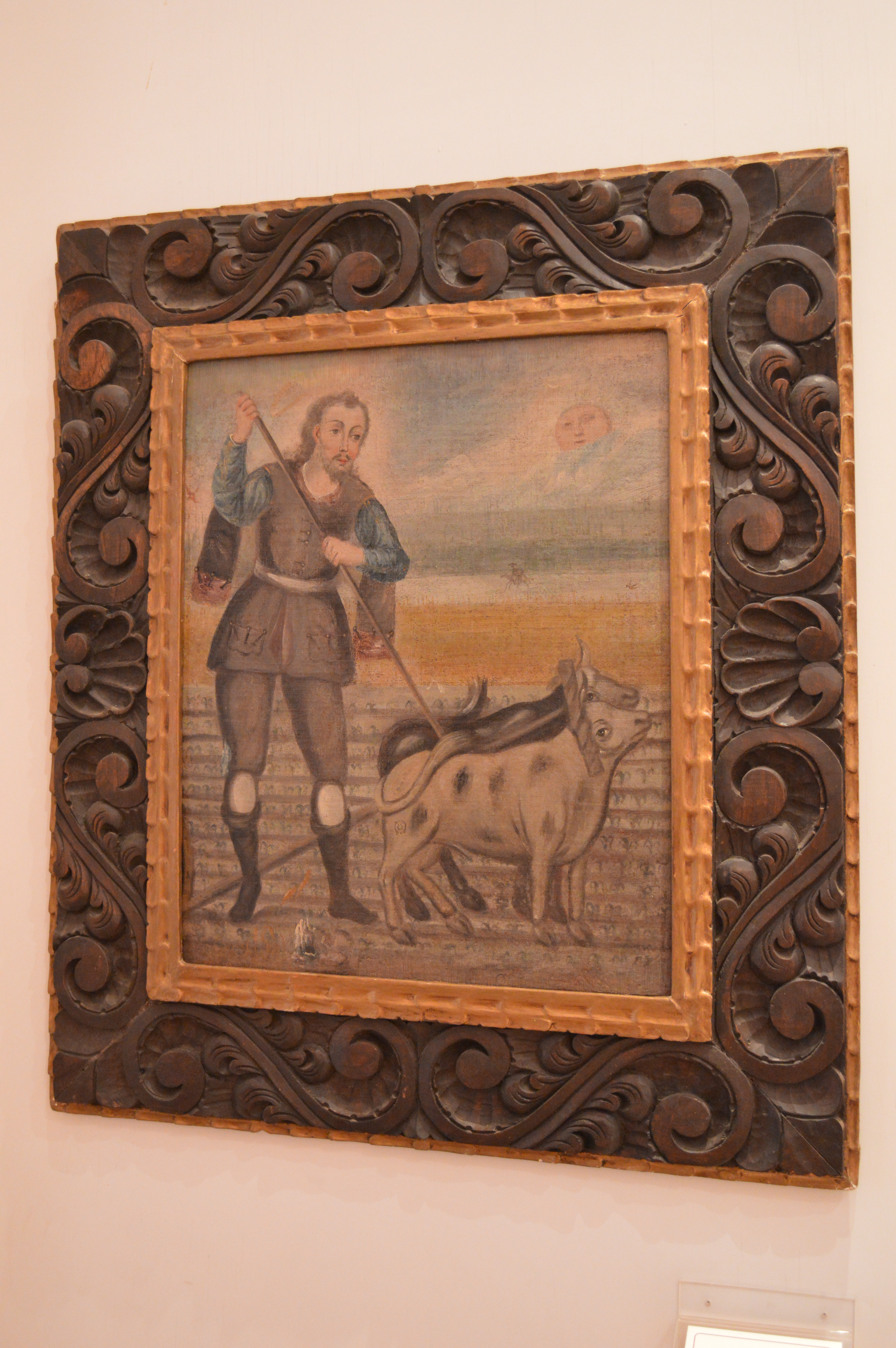

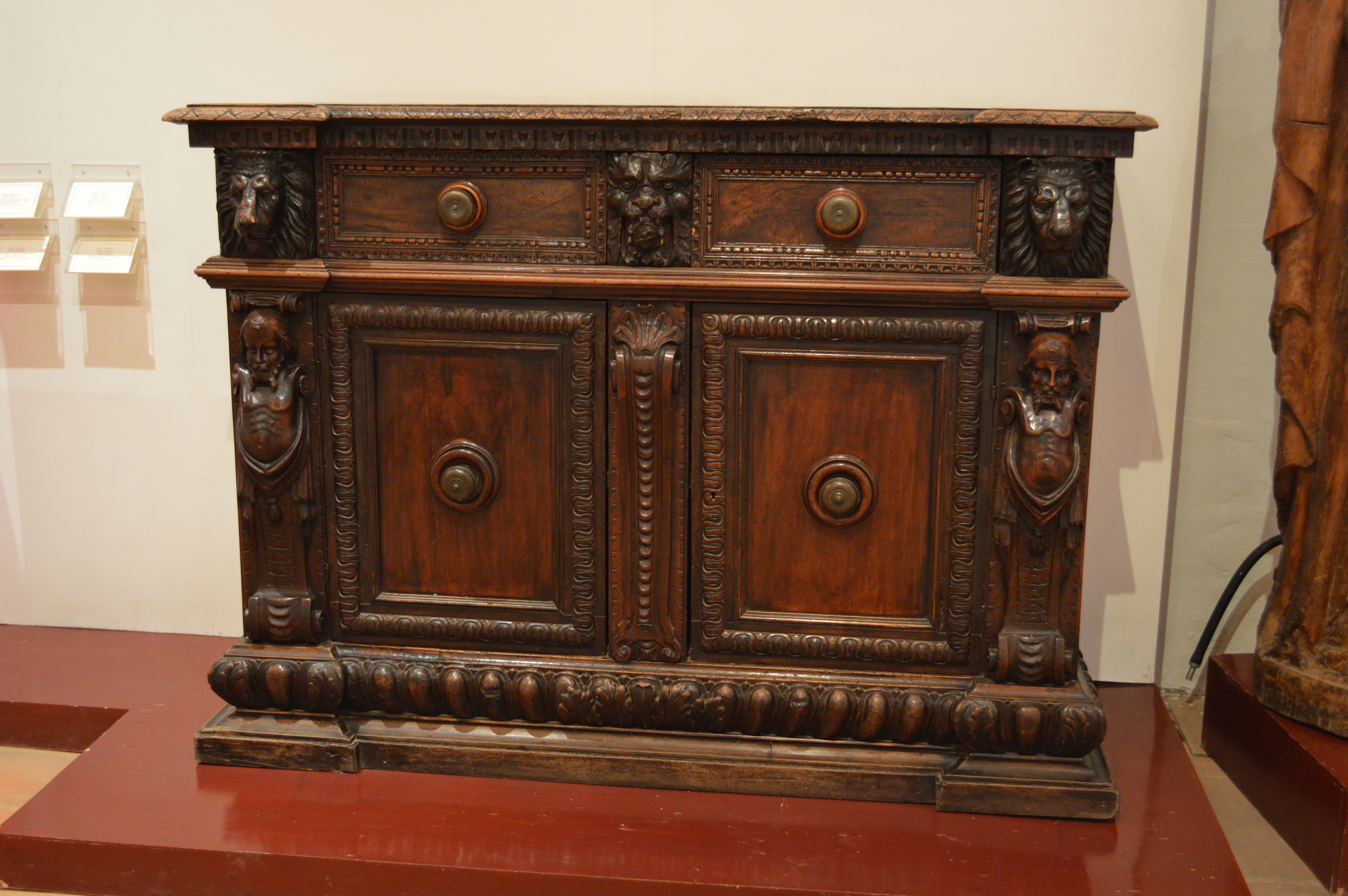

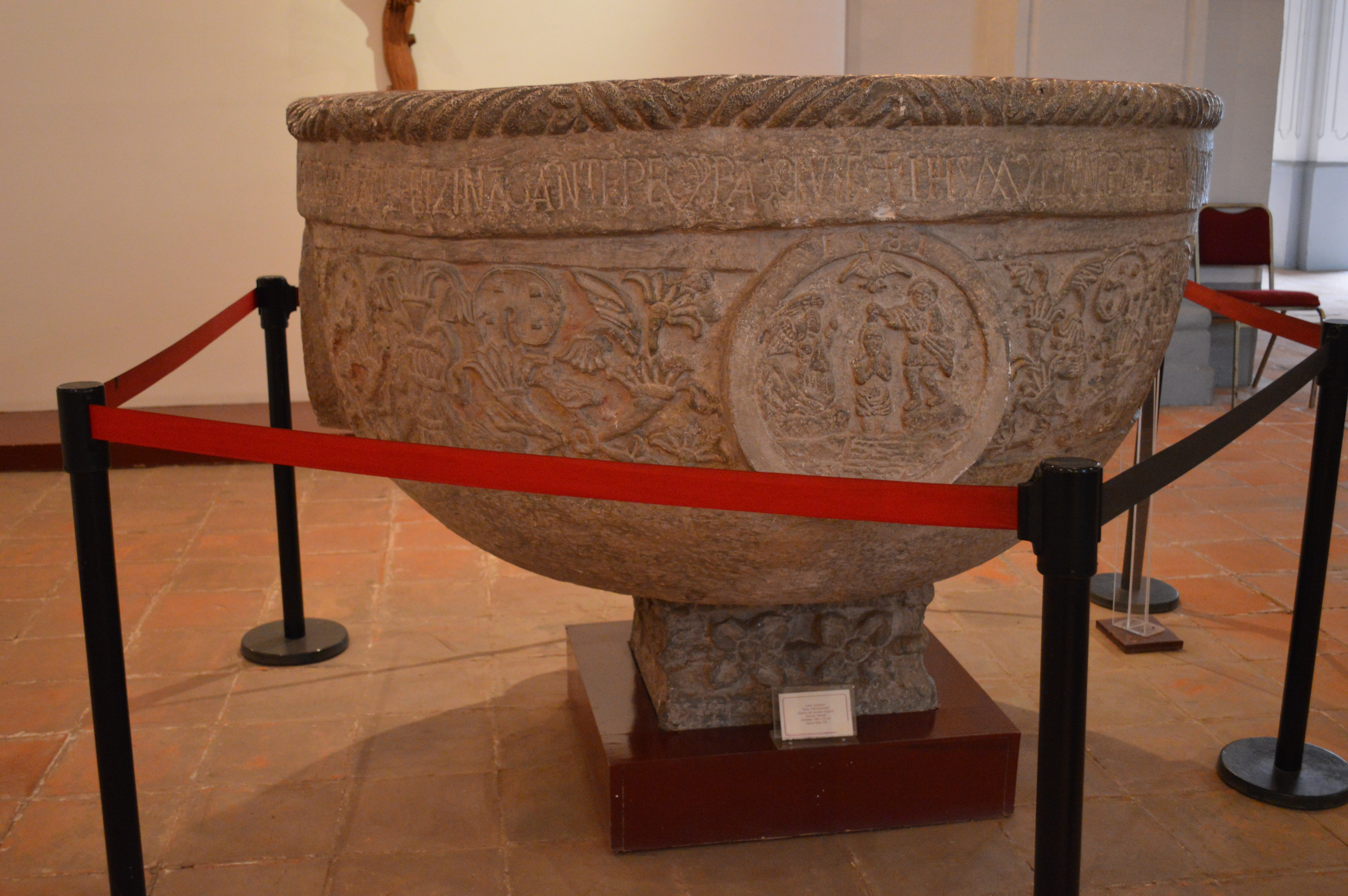
