= Our Lady of Sorrows (Cristóbal de Villalpando) =

Painting by Cristóbal de Villalpando

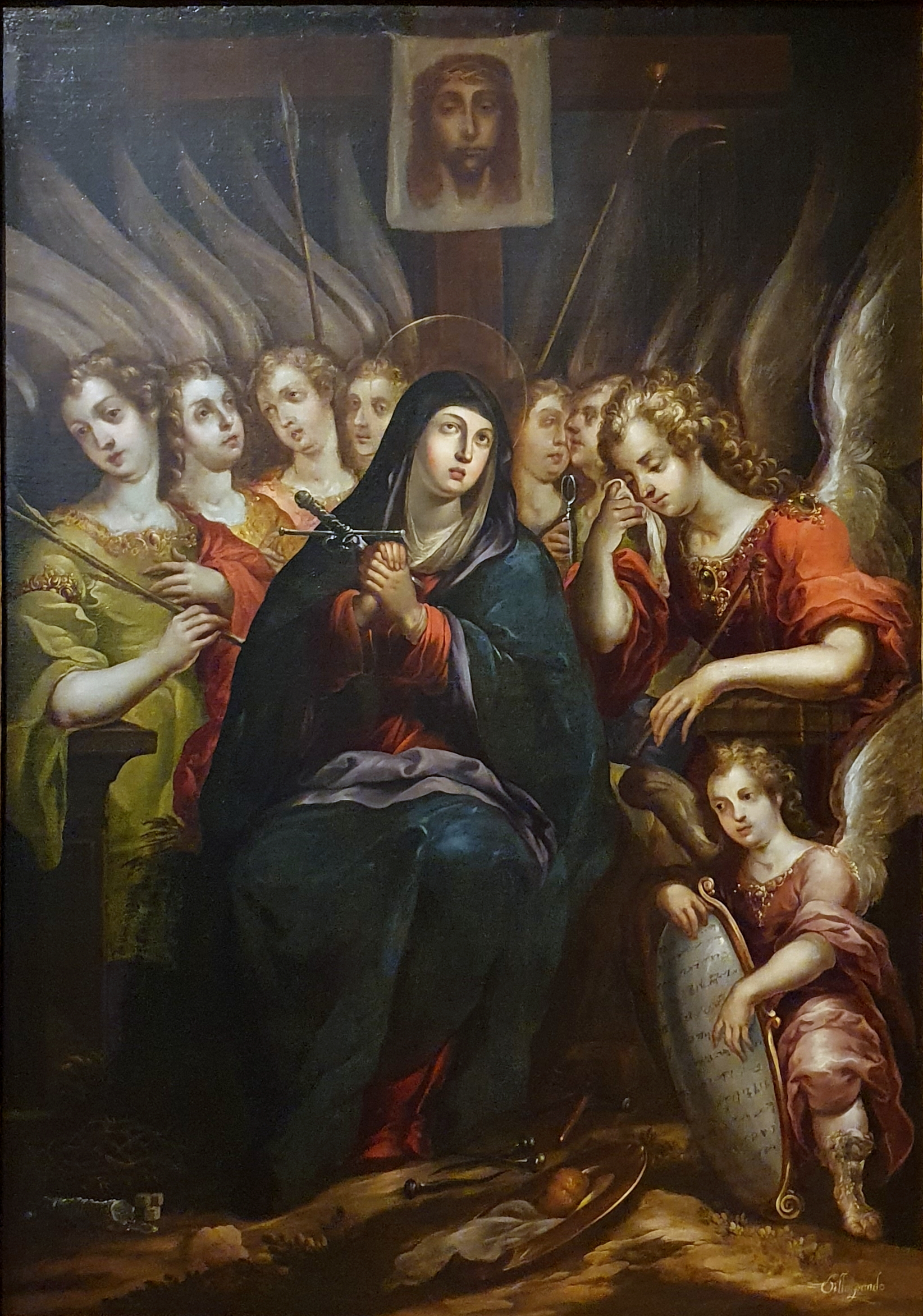
Cristóbal de Villalpando. Our lady of sorrows. Between c 1680 - 1689. Col. Museo Soumaya

La Dolorosa (Our Lady of Sorrows or Mater Dolorosa) is a work by Cristóbal de Villalpando probably painted between 1680 and 1689 and belonging to the collection of the Museo Soumaya in Mexico City.

== Context ==
In the work of Villalpando's early formative period, the influence of Baltasar de Echave Rioja and Pedro Ramírez is noticeable, as the painter's skills were nourished mainly by the artistic circles of the cities of Mexico and Puebla. His baroque style would prolong this pictorial tradition into the 1680s. From Echave he took the use of contrasting light, while from Ramírez he learned to create a strong sense of physical presence through correct drawing and anatomical accuracy. His use of accentuated chiaroscuro shows what Villalpando assimilated from the Spanish tradition, exemplified mainly by Zurburán and Rubens.

Villalpando was careful in his handling of line and light in his compositions, used to develop the subject or action. In the case of this work, the dynamism of the group of angels behind the Virgin Mary contrasts with the static nature of the principal figure, whose central position is accentuated by a precise, classical rendering. The use of the “hemicycle of angels” seems to be not simply a scenographic and decorative resource, but rather a constant in the way Villalpando handled this theme.

As for the subject itself, the veneration of the sorrows of the Virgin Mary had developed since the 16th century and was deeply rooted in New Spain, as it would continue to be later in Mexico. Evidence of this is provided by the countless panegyrics written on the theme and by the particular instances of this Marian devotion in Acatzingo, Puebla, and in Oaxaca. Since all of the religious orders in New Spain fostered this devotion, there was a considerable production of paintings of the Mater Dolorosa.

This work by Villalpando was formerly in the collection of Dr. José Luis Pérez de Salazar, before it passed into the collection of the Museo Soumaya at an unknown date. It was restored in 1995, under the supervision of Javier Padilla Leiner. Three other representations of the Mater Dolorosa by Villalpando are known to exist: one in the Museo Nacional del Virreinato, one in the Church of Our Lady of Mount Carmel in Guadalajara, and one in the private collection of Manuel Barbachano.

== Description ==
This work represents the Marian devotion of Our Lady of Sorrows, specifically her Seven Sorrows, a frequent pictorial theme in Christian art, alongside the Pietà and the Stabat Mater. The Virgin Mary is depicted with a dagger piercing her breast, symbolizing her deep sorrow. The angels behind her, attired in fine fabrics and jewels, hold symbols of the Passion of Christ. In the upper part of the painting there is a cross bearing an image of Christ and at the bottom other elements of the passion story, such as nails, a crown of thorns, and the dice which the soldiers rolled to divide up Christ's garments. An angel holds a mirror that reflects Mary's sorrows to the world. It is inscribed (upside down) with a fragment of the Stabat Mater of Jacopone da Todi.

The painting bears the signature of the artist (“Villalpando”) at the bottom right.
