= Mexico City Riot of 1692 =

History of Mexico City

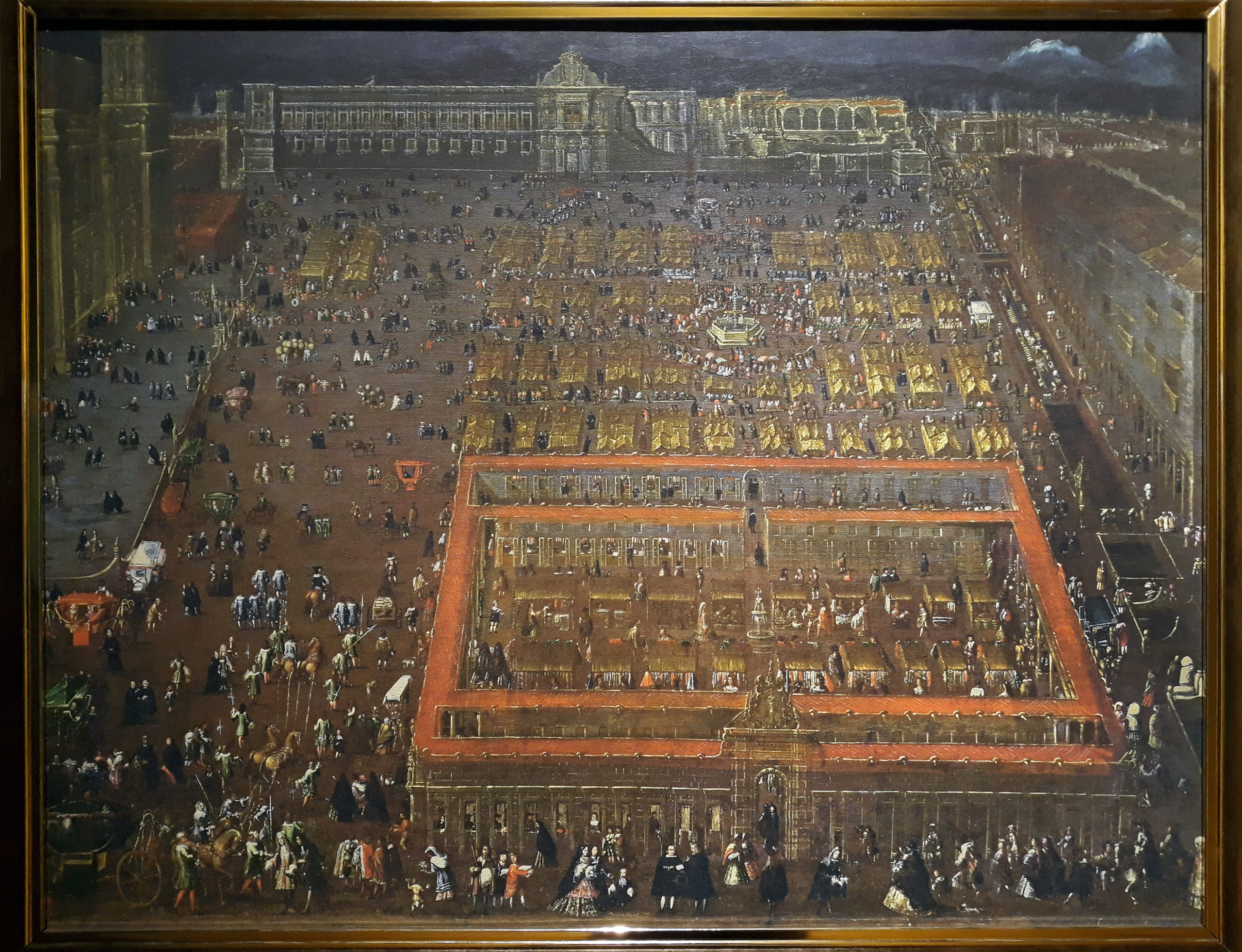
View of the Plaza de Armas in Mexico City, by Cristóbal de Villalpando. 1695.

On June 8, 1692, in Mexico City, between 4 and 11 at night, a riot took place. The city was celebrating the traditional Feast of Corpus Christi. At this time, there was a collective tension due to the shortage of staple foods, like maize and wheat. This tension was directly related to the discontent of the inhabitants because the authorities in charge of the supply were speculating with the grain reserve stored in the granary and in the alhóndiga.

== Food shortages due to flooding ==
Life had become difficult for the indigenous, mestizos, mulattos, and poor Spaniards. In the previous year, maize and wheat crops had failed due to flooding. That day a fairly large group of indigenous people, approximately 10,000, rebelled against the urban authorities, joined by some mestizos, mulattos and poor Spaniards. The crowd destroyed a number of government buildings such as the Palace of the Viceroys and the City Hall, burned administrative archives and set fire to the merchants' drawers located in the main square.

== Written accounts ==
This event made a strong impression on the society of the capital of the New Spain as it was the first social rebellion since the beginning of the viceregal period. This was widely reported by Carlos de Sigüenza y Góngora, the journalist Antonio de Robles and the then chronicler of the Third Order of Saint Dominic, Thomas de la Fuente Salazar. The riot was also described by Pierre and Jean-Baptiste Talon, Canadiens of Neuville (Royal Province of Canada, Vice-Royalty of New France) in their interrogation made in Brest

== Depiction in a 1695 painting ==
One of the wings of the Palace of the Viceroys is seen destroyed after the fire caused during the riot in a 1695 painting by Cristóbal de Villalpando that was commissioned by the Viceroy Count of Galve.

== Bibliography ==
- Silva Prada, Natalia (2007). La política de una rebelión. Los indígenas frente al tumulto de 1692 en la Ciudad de México. El Colegio de México. ISBN 978-968-12-12209.
