= House of the Marquis of Uluapa, Mexico City =

Coordinates: 19°25′49.49″N 99°8′4.66″W

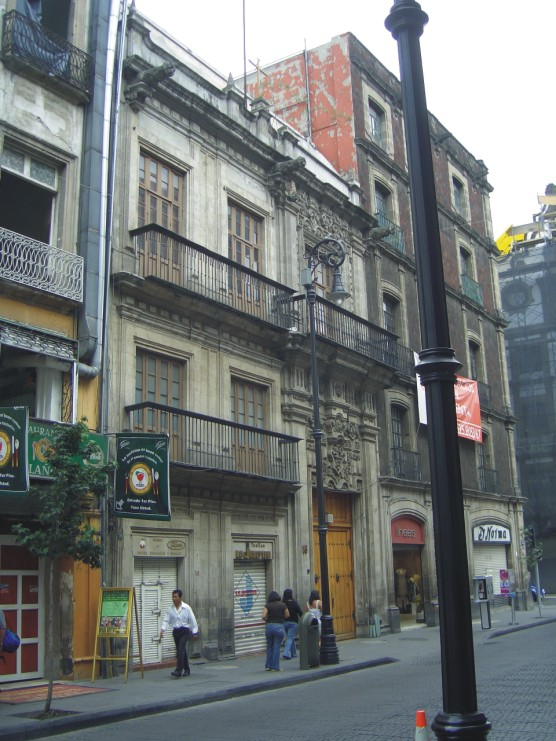
Facade of the House of the Marquis of Uluapa

The House of the Marquis of Uluapa is located on 5 de Febrero Street in the historic center of Mexico City, Mexico. No one knows who originally owned the house but it has been proven that it never belonged to the Marquis of Uluapa. For this reason, it is officially archived only as “the house at number 18, 5 de Febrero Street.” However, the house remains popularly known as the House of the Marquis of Uluapa.

The facade has two levels with a mezzanine which was fairly common for houses built in the 18th century. The mezzanine usually served as offices for the house’s owner and contained its own separate entrance. The entrance of the mezzanine had large booths. The flat areas of the facade are more simply decorated but there are gargoyles. The main entrance is decorated with sculpted plants, chain links, volutes, mollusk shells and small grotesque masks. The patio arches have pyramidal decorations.

However, it is what is inside the house that is its most distinguishing feature. Inside, on the second floor, are tile murals made in Mexico City with life-sized images of servants such as butlers, washwomen, and cobblers. Murals of this type usually were designed with religious imagery. The house is not open to the public.
