= Chamber of Notaries of Mexico City =

College of notaries in Mexico City

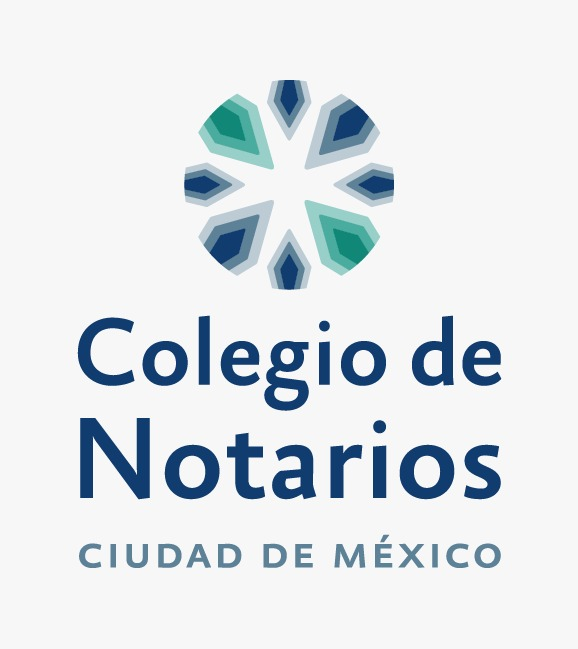
- Chamber of Notaries of Mexico City

The Chamber of Notaries of Mexico City is a professional member institution created in 1792, making it one of the oldest professional associations in Latin America.

Its main function is to unite the holders of active notaries in the Mexican capital, aiming to contribute to the proper performance of notarial functions and promote legality and legal certainty among the city's residents.

== History ==
The origins of the Chamber dates back to September 2, 1573, when the decree for the operation of the Brotherhood of the Four Evangelists was issued in Spain. On June 19, 1792, the Royal Chamber of Notaries of Mexico was founded through the Royal Decree of Aranjuez issued by King Charles IV of Spain. Since its founding, it has operated continuously for over 200 years, making the Chamber of Mexico City the oldest in America.

== Social Function of notary services ==
Article 12 of Notarial Law for Mexico City states that every persons has the right to access to professional notarial services. Therefore, the notary has to provide their professional services when it is required by competent authorities, private individuals or in compliance of judicial resolutions. Also, all notaries have to participate in the legal aid programs required by public policy or law.

In compliance of these provisions, the Chamber provides free legal counseling regarding property issues and the establishment of companies, among other subjects, urgent notarial attention, the "Month of the Will", where people can issue their wills at reduced prices and collaboration in various social programs created by diverse government authorities.

Further, the Chamber help during the electoral process, giving legal credit to actions performed by citizens, candidates and political parties.

Also, it has a shared responsibility regarding The General Archive of Notaries, an historical archive that contains important documents concerning Mexican historical characters and processes.

The importance of the notarial services was noted during the pandemic, when it was declared as essential work.

== Access to notarial services ==
The Notary function in Mexico City is subject to compulsory membership. Every notary has to belong to one of the Chambers. The membership can be gained by passing an exam and receiving it's legal permit issued by the local government.

== Organic Structure ==
The head of the Chamber is the President which is aided in its functions by the Board, composed by the aforementioned President and nine other members. It also has 7 Commissions each one in charge of a particular subject important to the correct performance of the notarial services.

The presidency of the Chamber renews every two years. It is elected by the Assembly of Notaries and must meet seniority and experience in previous functions within the Chamber's board.

== Presidents of the Chamber ==
Alfredo González Serrano (1996 - 1997)

Mario Pérez Salinas (1998 - 1999)

Jorge Alfredo Domínguez Martínez (2000 - 2002)

Antonio Velarde Violante (2002 - 2004)

Alfonso Zermeño Infante (2004 - 2006)

Javier Pérez Almaraz (2006 - 2008)

José Ignacio Sentíes Laborde (2008 - 2010)

Erick Salvador Pulliam Aburto (2010 - 2012)

Ignacio R. Morales Lechuga (2012 - 2014)

Heriberto Castillo Villanueva (2014 - 2016)

Sara Cuevas Villalobos (2016 - 2018)

Marco Antonio Ruiz Aguirre (2018 - 2020)

Ponciano López Juárez (2020 - 2022)

Luis Antonio Montes De Oca M. (2022 - 2024)

Roberto Garzón Jiménez (2024 - 2026)
