= Cristóbal de Villalpando =

Painter from New Spain

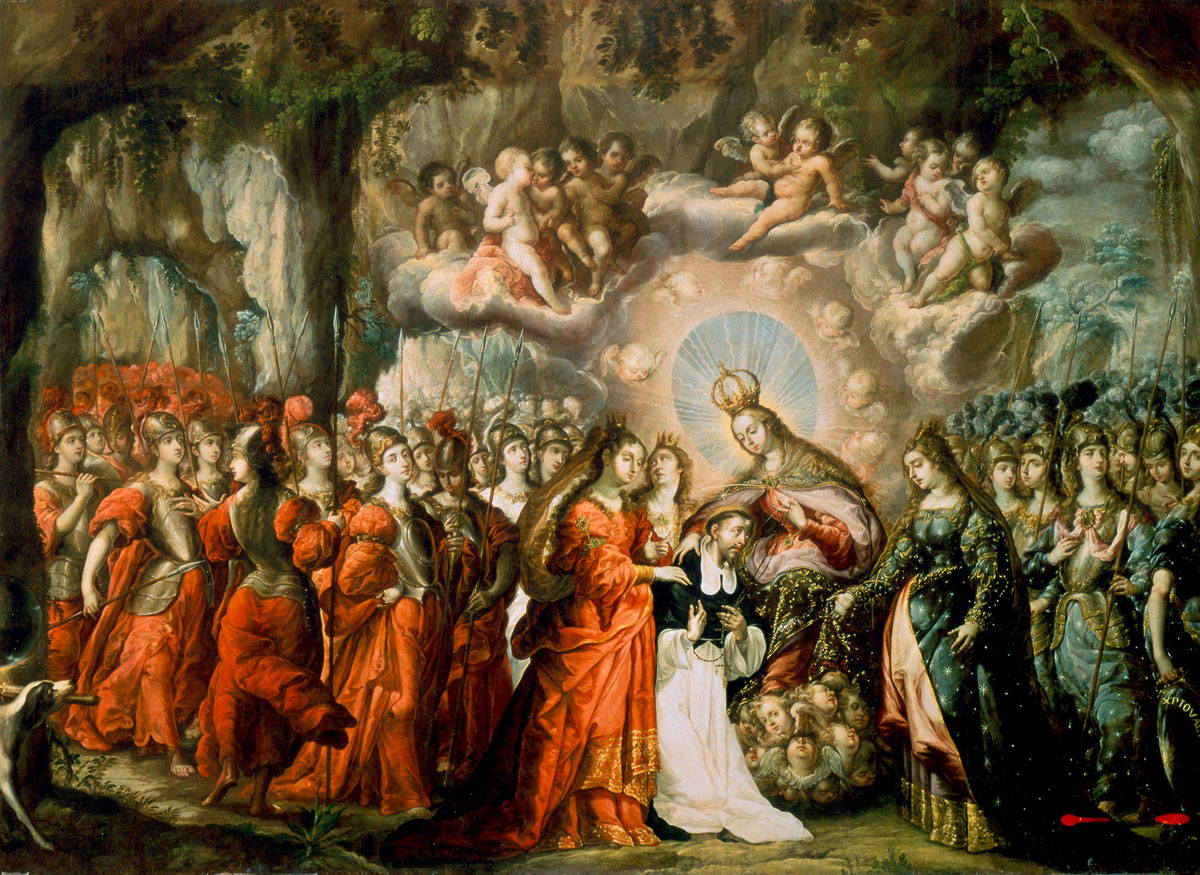
The Lactación de Santo Domingo, painted near the end of the 17th century

Cristóbal de Villalpando (ca. 1649 – 20 August 1714) was a Baroque Criollo artist from New Spain, arts administrator and captain of the guard. He painted prolifically and produced many Baroque works now displayed in several Mexican cathedrals, including the cathedrals in Querétaro, Puebla and Mexico City, as well as a depiction of the Zócalo (main square) in Mexico City, showing the damage of the 1692 riot to the viceregal palace three years earlier.

== Life ==
Born in Mexico City to the influential Villalpando family, Cristóbal assumed duties in the local militia as an ensign, as well as painting with Baltasar de Echave Rioja (Echave the Younger) in the Echave workshop. In 1669, he married María de Mendoza and they had four children. He received several religious art commissions, both in Mexico City and in Puebla. Other paintings by his hand are found in the sacristy of the Mexico City Cathedral.

Villalpando rose to the rank of captain and in 1686 was named one of three directors of the painters' guild in Mexico, the position he served several times as director (veedor).

Villalpando included a self-portrait in his Apparition of Saint Michael on Mount Gargano in the sacristy of the Mexico City cathedral. His portrait is nested among the clergy at the bottom right.

Villapando died in Mexico City in 1714 and was buried there.

== Style ==
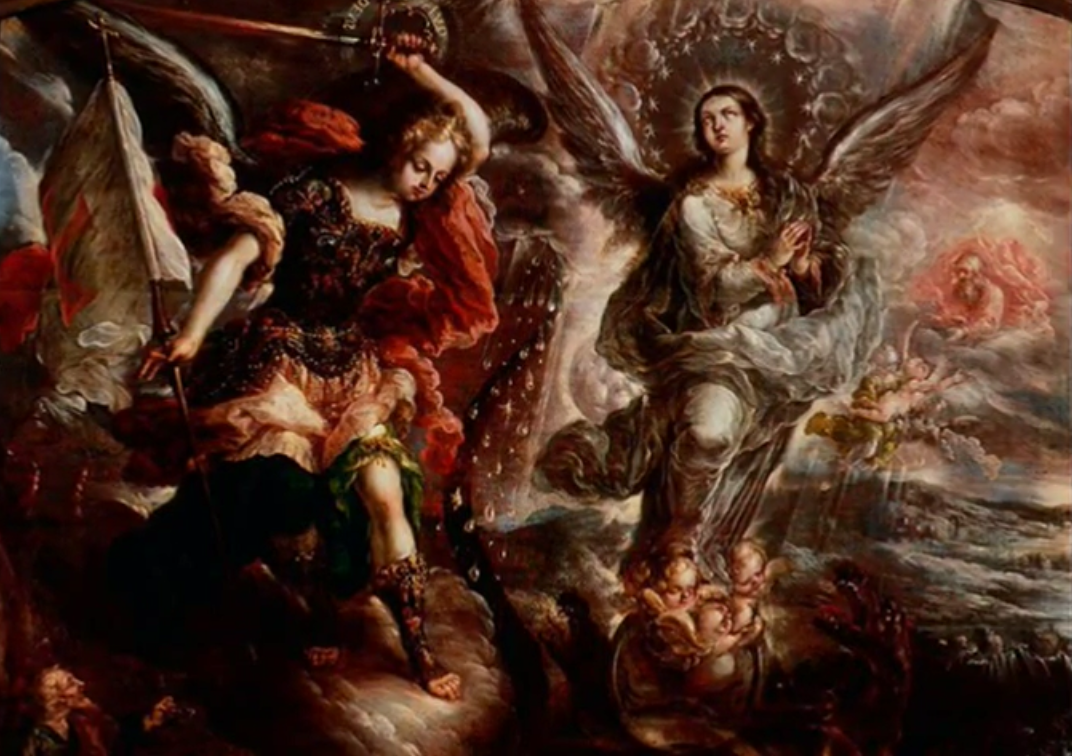
The Virgin of the Apocalypse, Museo Bello y González, Puebla

Villalpando's early works attest to the influence of Peter Paul Rubens; however, as his style continued to develop, he moved away from the extremes of vivid coloring and excessive robustness to a more measured style, using a broad palette and incorporating more of the New World painting traditions. In his later work he moved away from uniform luminosity, employing greater contrast and placing artificial light sources within his paintings to add a touch of drama. His work was much emulated.

Villalpando tailored his style to the nature of the work and to its patron. He employed rough blots and smudges to good effect, but used meticulous brushstrokes when required.

== Works ==
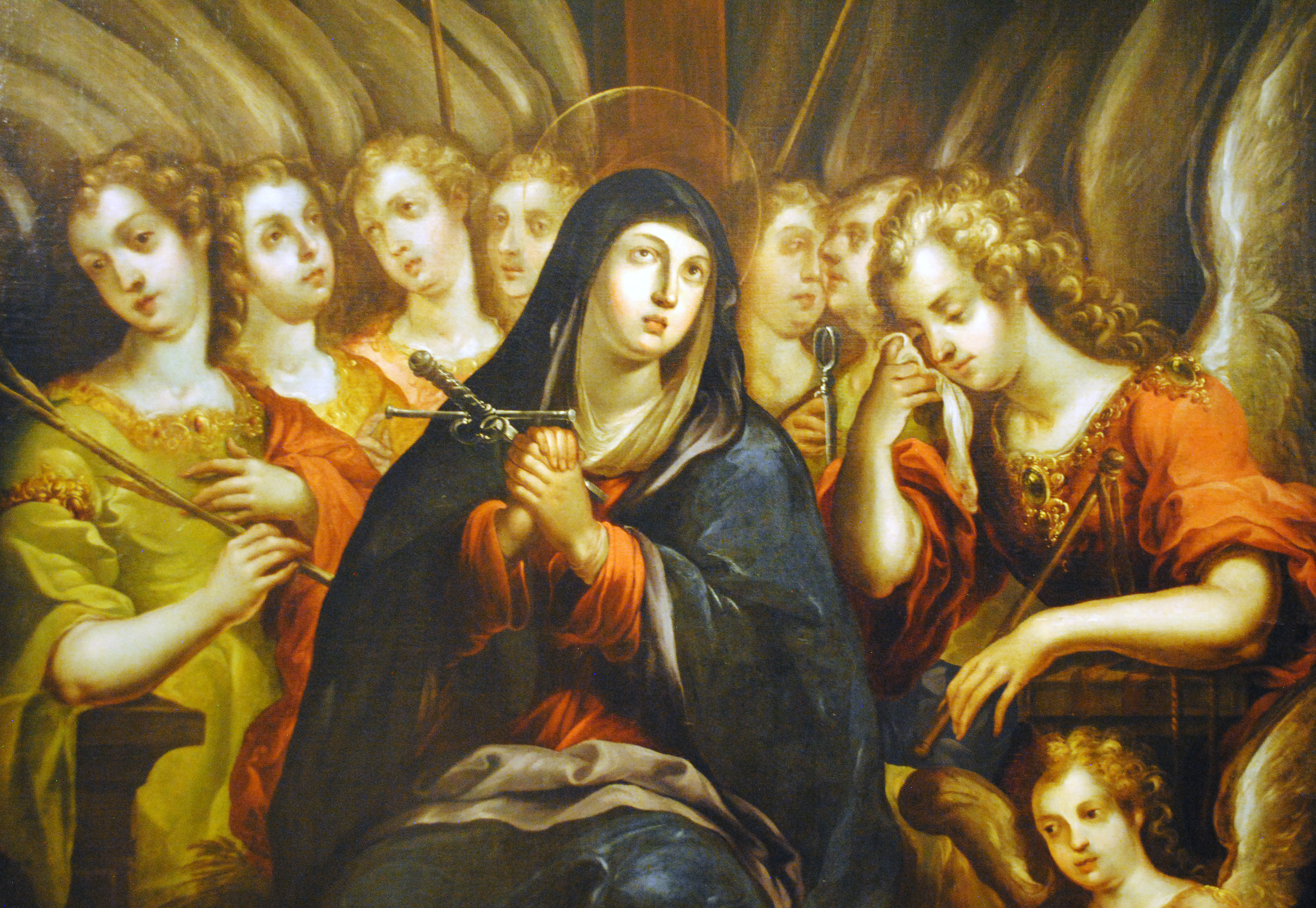
Cristóbal de Villalpando. Our Lady of Sorrows. Between 1680 - 1689. Col. Museo Soumaya (Detail)

Villalpando's early works include a number for the Puebla Cathedral. These cathedral works include a large painting of The Transfiguration, climaxing with the Assumption of the Virgin on the inside of the dome of the apse chapel, and incorporate themes from the eucharist. His large altar piece from the Puebla cathedral, Moses and the Brazen Serpent and the Transfiguration of Jesus (1683) was featured in a recent major exhibit in Mexico City and at the Metropolitan Museum of Art in New York.

For the sacristy of the Mexico City cathedral he painted

- The Church Militant and the Church Triumphant,
- The Triumph of Religion,
- The Virgin of the Apocalypse,
- Our Lady of Sorrows,
- The Apparition of Saint Michael Archangel, and others.

Most of Villalpando's portraits have been lost, as well as a number of his religious works. However, one of his religious masterpieces, The Adoration of the Magi (1683), was recently discovered by an art history professor to have been hanging in the president's office at Fordham University. It was subsequently featured in the Metropolitan Museum of Art's Villalpando exhibition, Mexican Painter of the Baroque, in 2017.

== View of the Zócalo of Mexico City (1695) ==
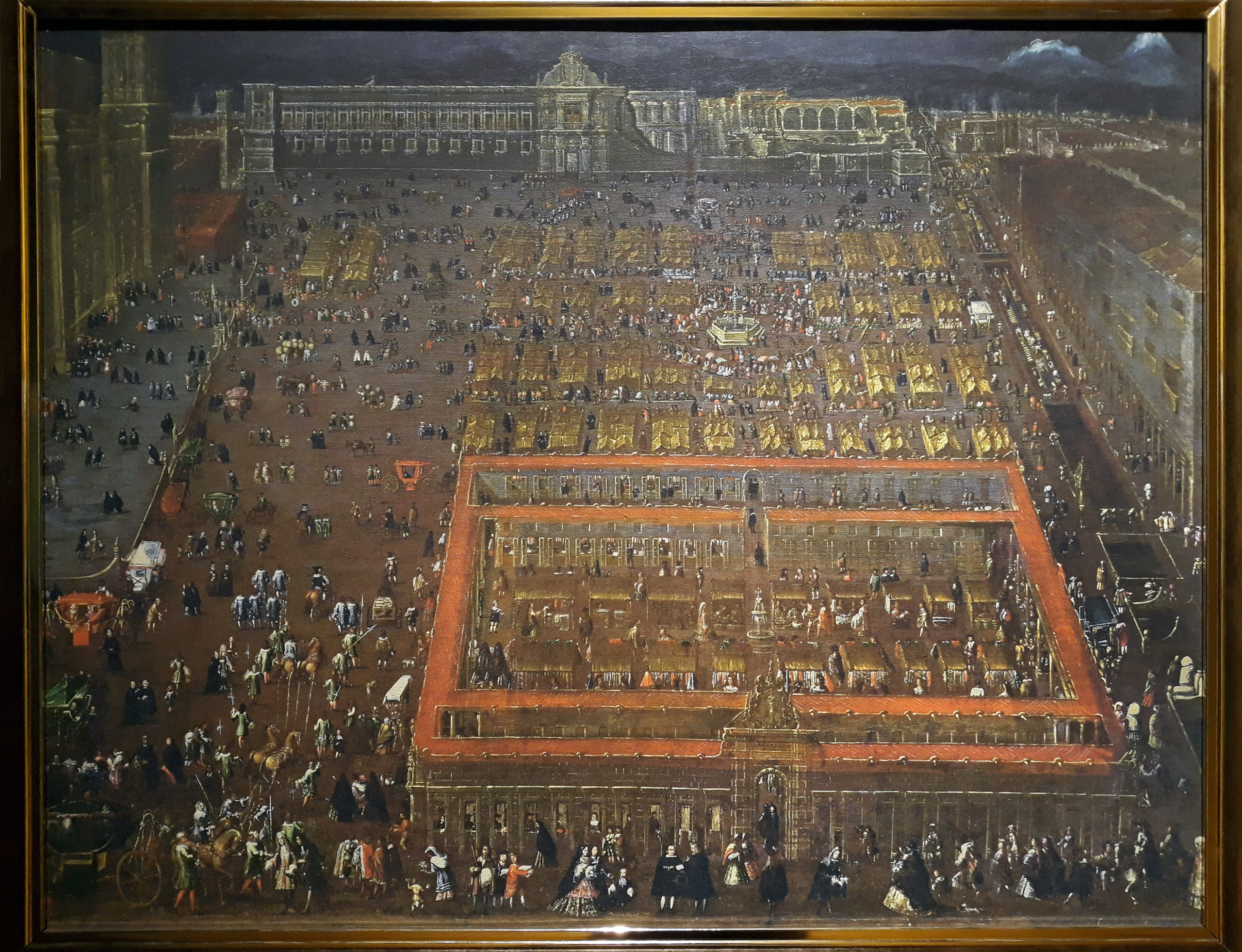
View of the Plaza Mayor of Mexico City (1695)

Villalpando's painting of the main square of Mexico City is an important work not only for showing the major buildings and architectural features surrounding the capital's main square (Metropolitan Cathedral, palace of the viceroy, the palace of the archbishop, the town council or ayuntamiento building, and the enclosed commercial area, the Parían Market, and the canal alongside the Portal de las Flores), but also the activities of Mexico City residents of all races and classes. An important historical feature of the painting is the depiction of the fire damage to the viceroy's palace by mob in 1692. The viceroy of Mexico, Don Gaspar de Sandoval Silva y Mendoza, Count of Gelve, commissioned the painting by Mexico City's foremost artist of the late seventeenth century. Gelves was returning to Spain after a decidedly mixed record as viceroy, which saw disorder culminating in the June 1692 riot and perhaps wanted the painting as a souvenir of his period as viceroy.

It is notable that Villalpando paints the ruined façade of the viceroy's palace and does not take artist's license to paint out this major historical event in Mexico City's history. From the commercial and social activity in the Zócalo that Villalpando paints in exceptional detail, the main appears to have gone back to its normal importance. Elites in their finery brought by carriage to the square, richly stocked shops, and a plethora of Indian and casta market sellers are depicted. The view has been considered metonymic, where "Villalpando equates the zócalo with Mexico City. The harmony and prosperity the scene evokes makes it almost possible to ignore the damaged façade of the viceregal palace.... The painting, now in the private collection of Lord Methuen at Corsham Court, UK, has been used as the cover illustration for two important books on colonial Spanish America.

== Gallery ==
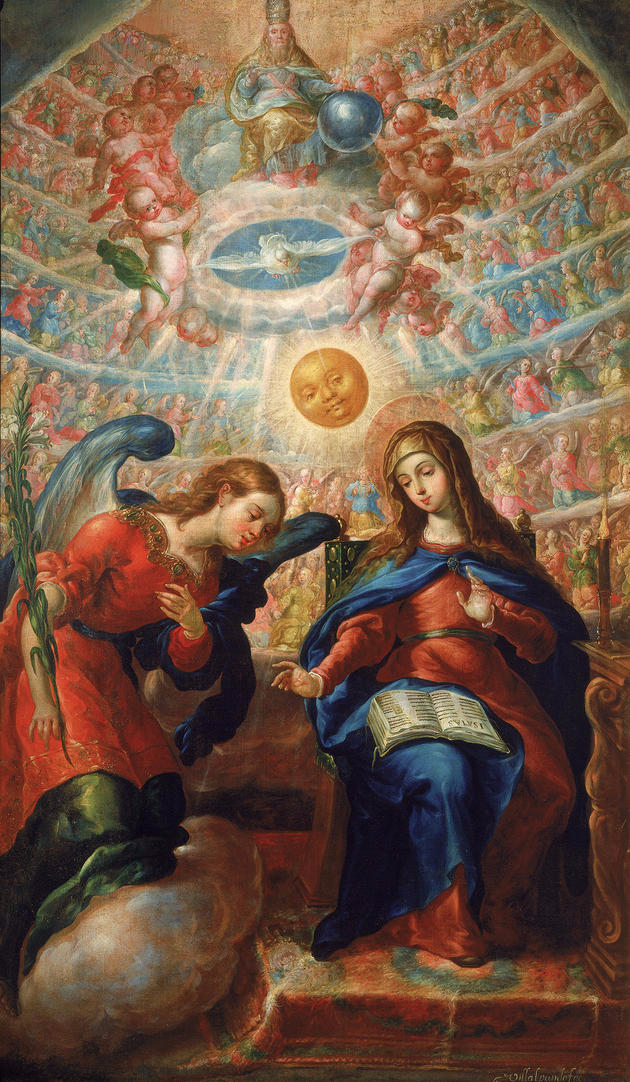
The Annunciation (1706)

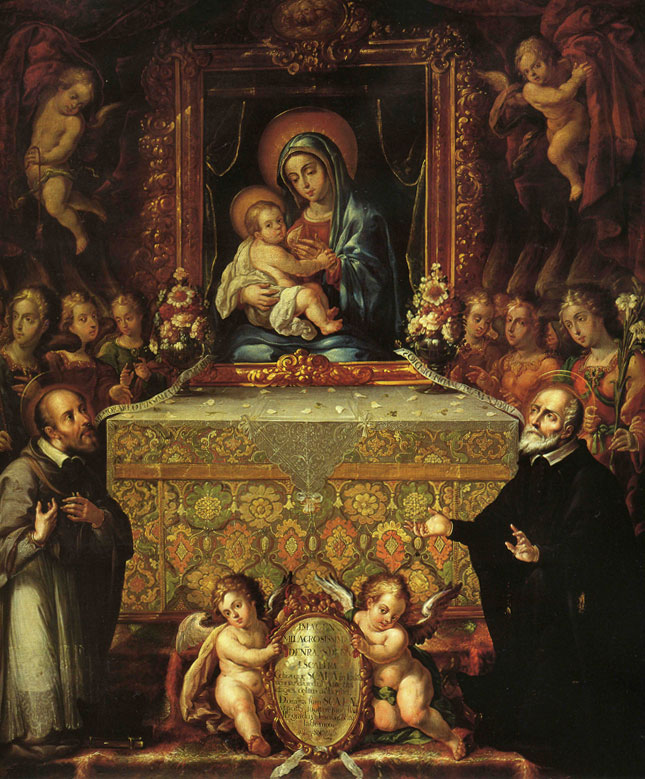
Madonna of the Stairs

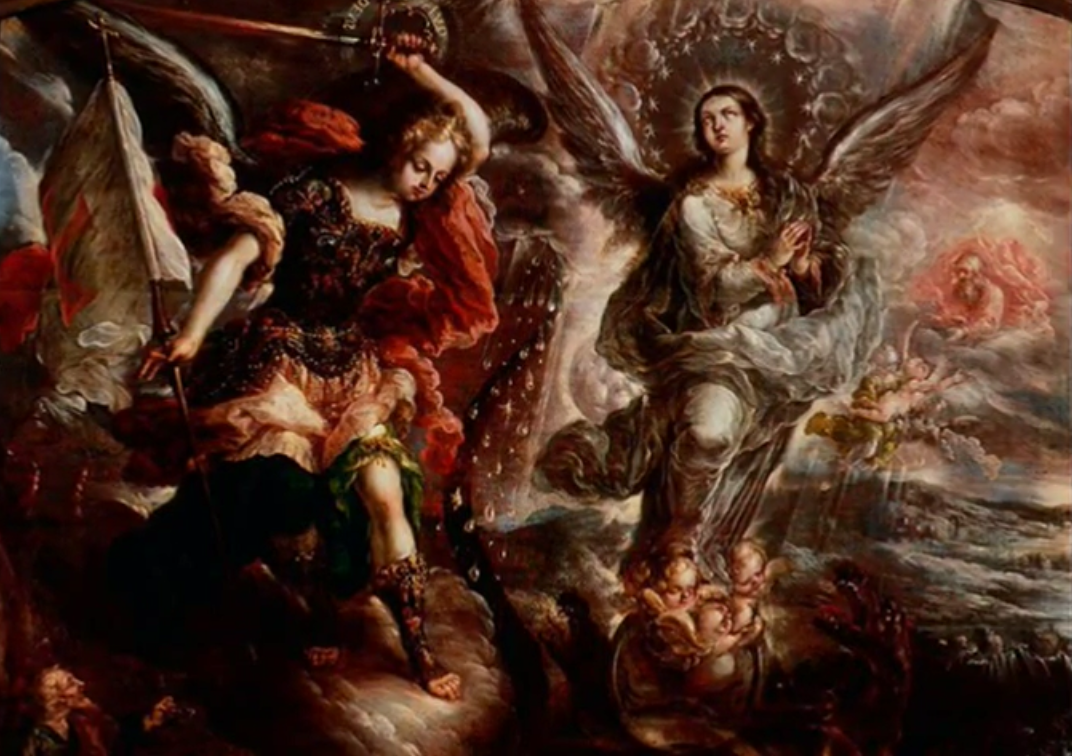
The Virgin of the Apocalypse

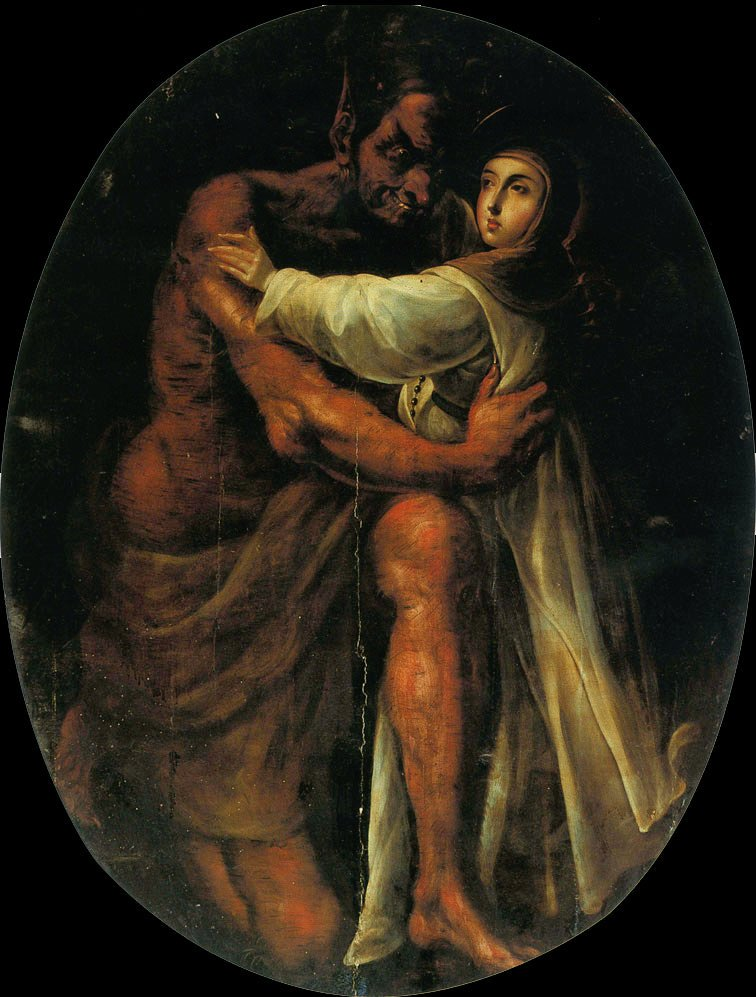
Saint Rose Tempted by the Devil

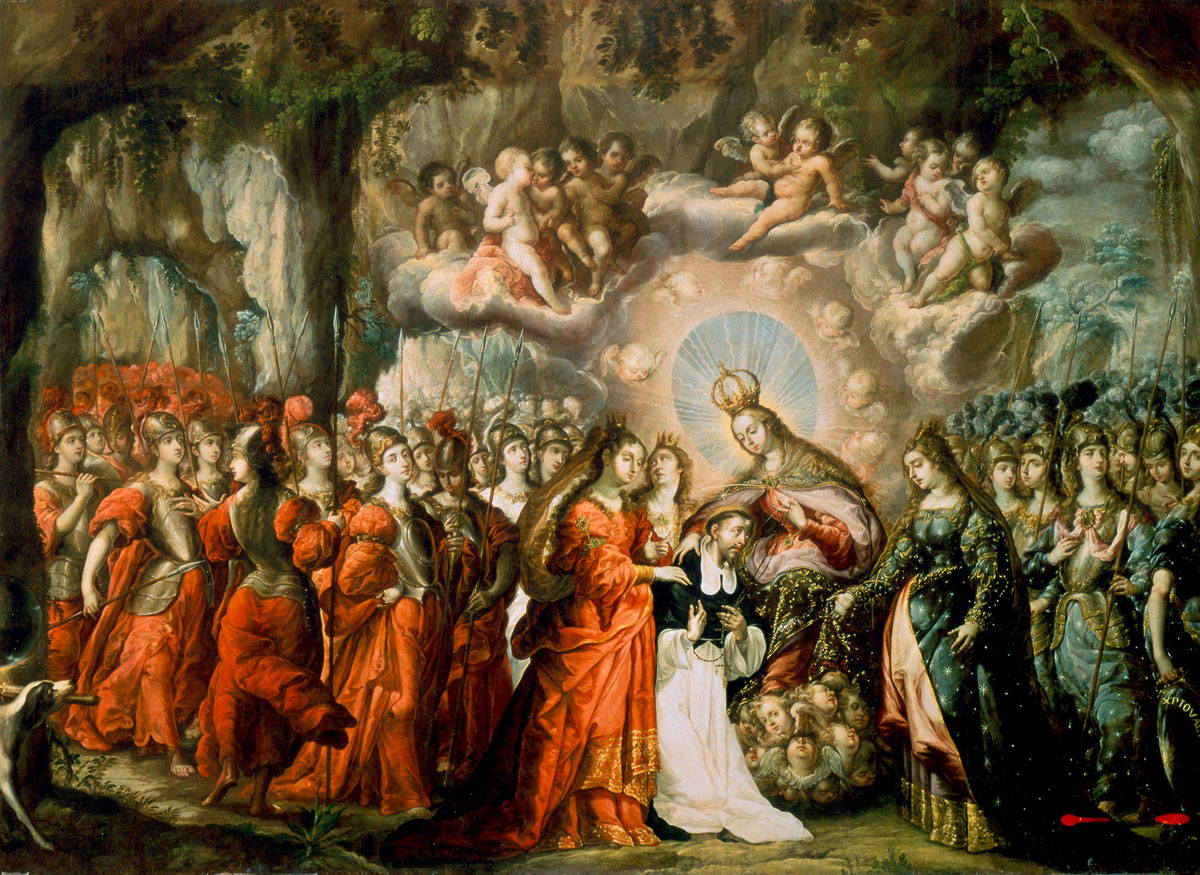
Lactation of Saint Dominic

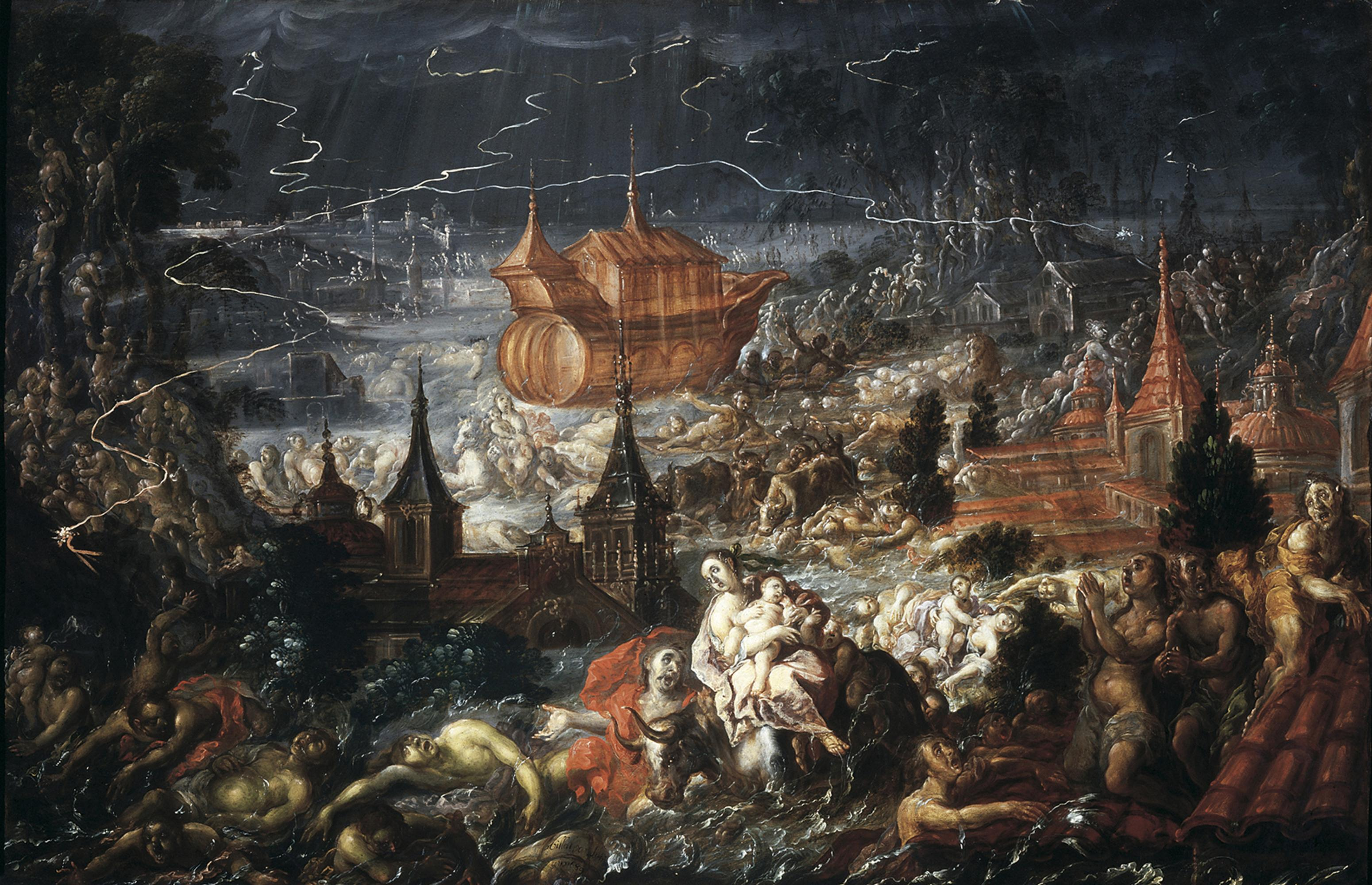
The Deluge

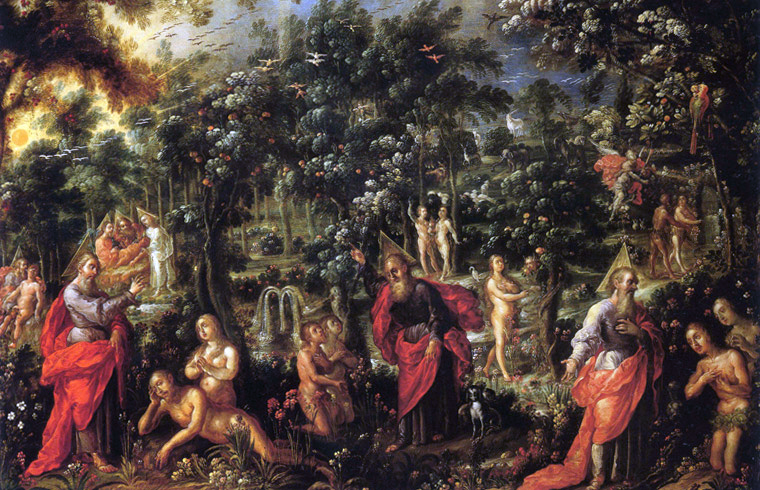
Adam and Eve in Paradise

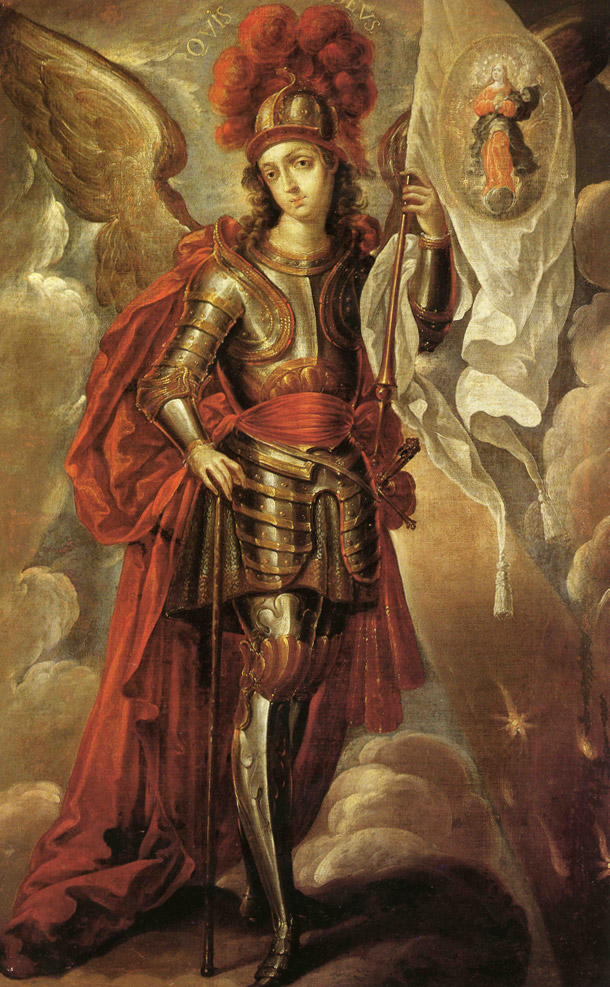
Saint Michael the Archangel

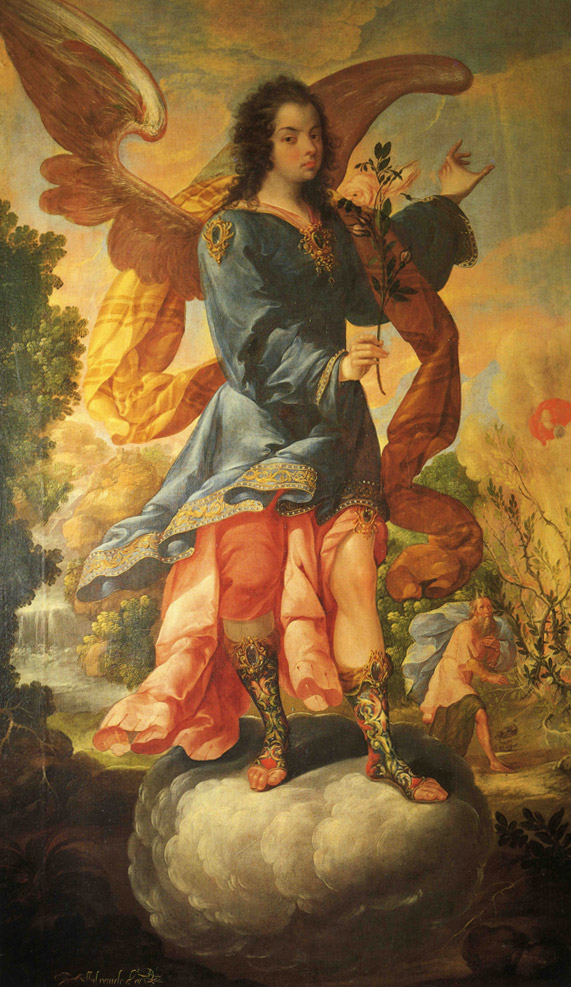
Archangel Barachiel

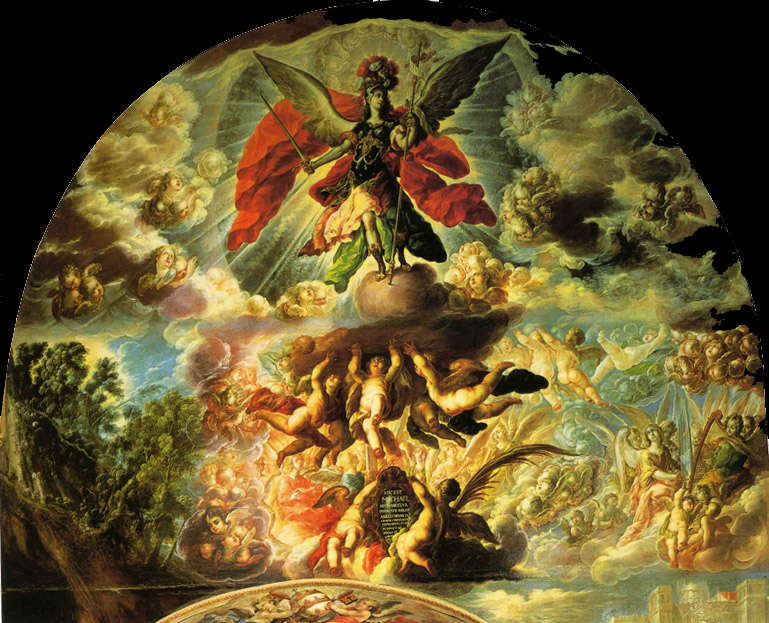
Apparition of Saint Michael

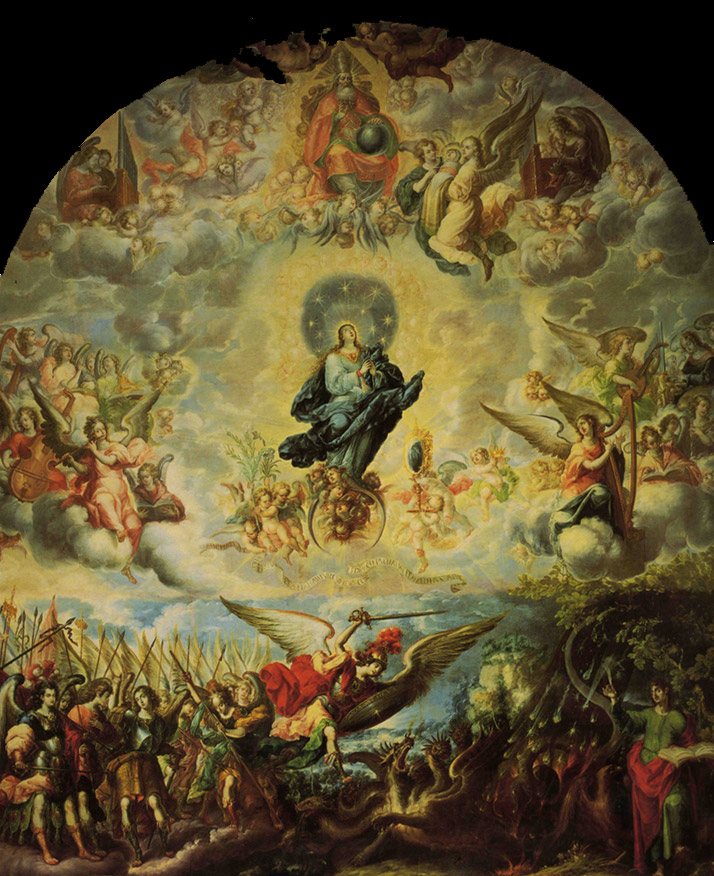
Woman of the Apocalypse

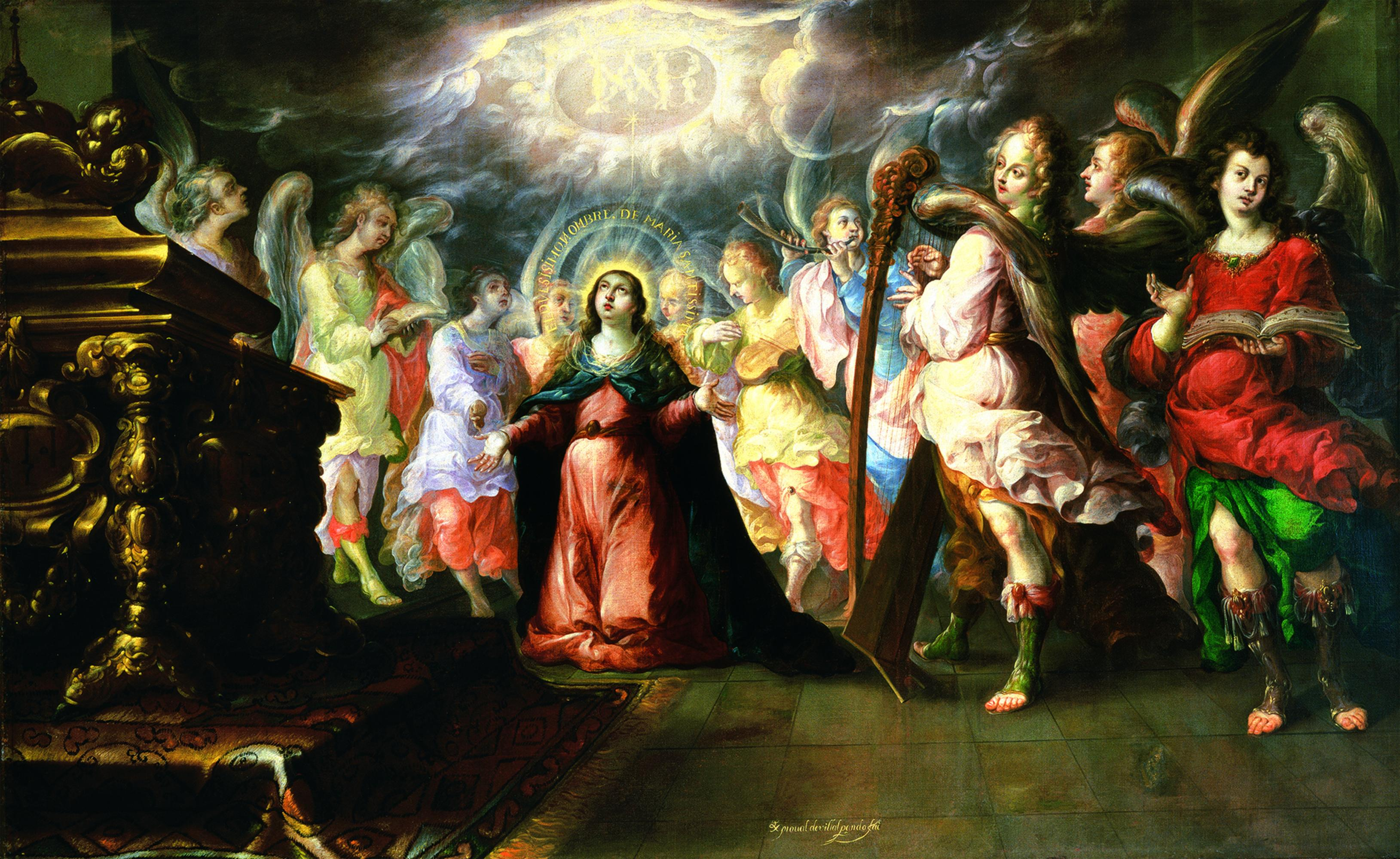
The Sweet Name of Mary

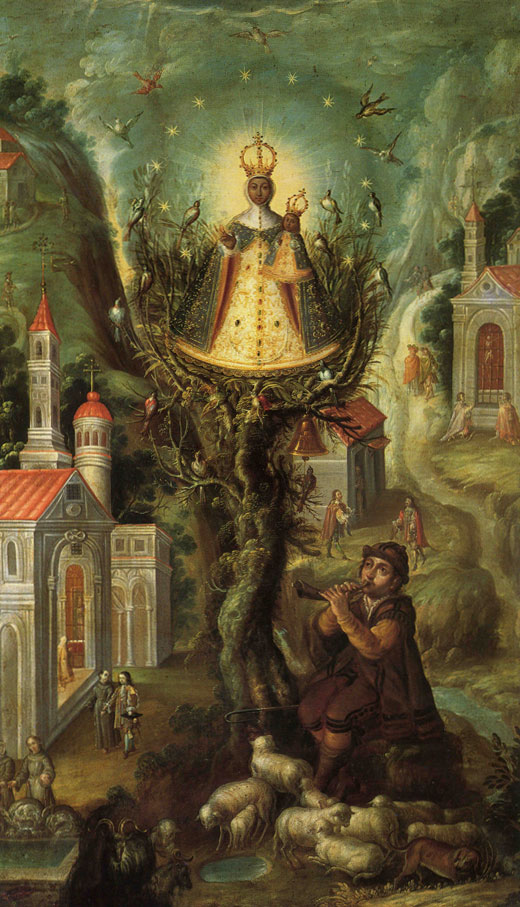
Our Lady of Aranzazú

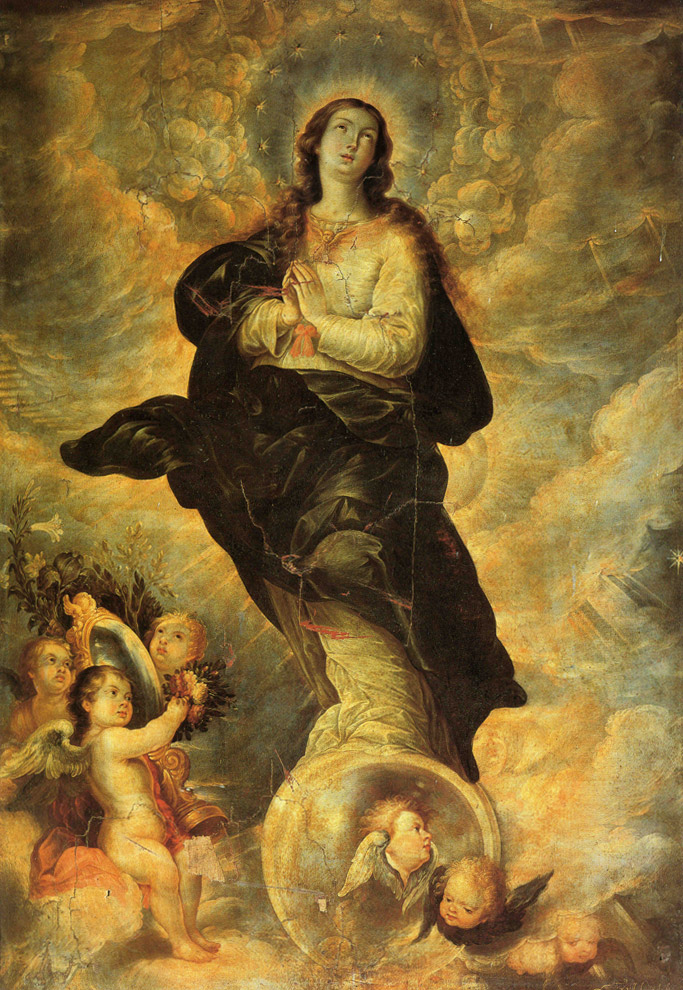
Immaculate Conception

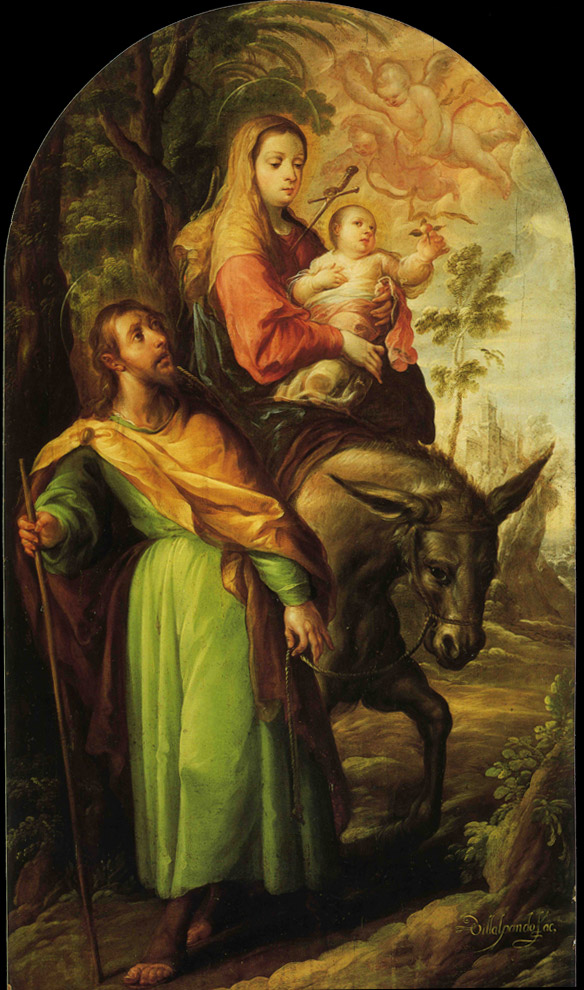
Flight into Egypt

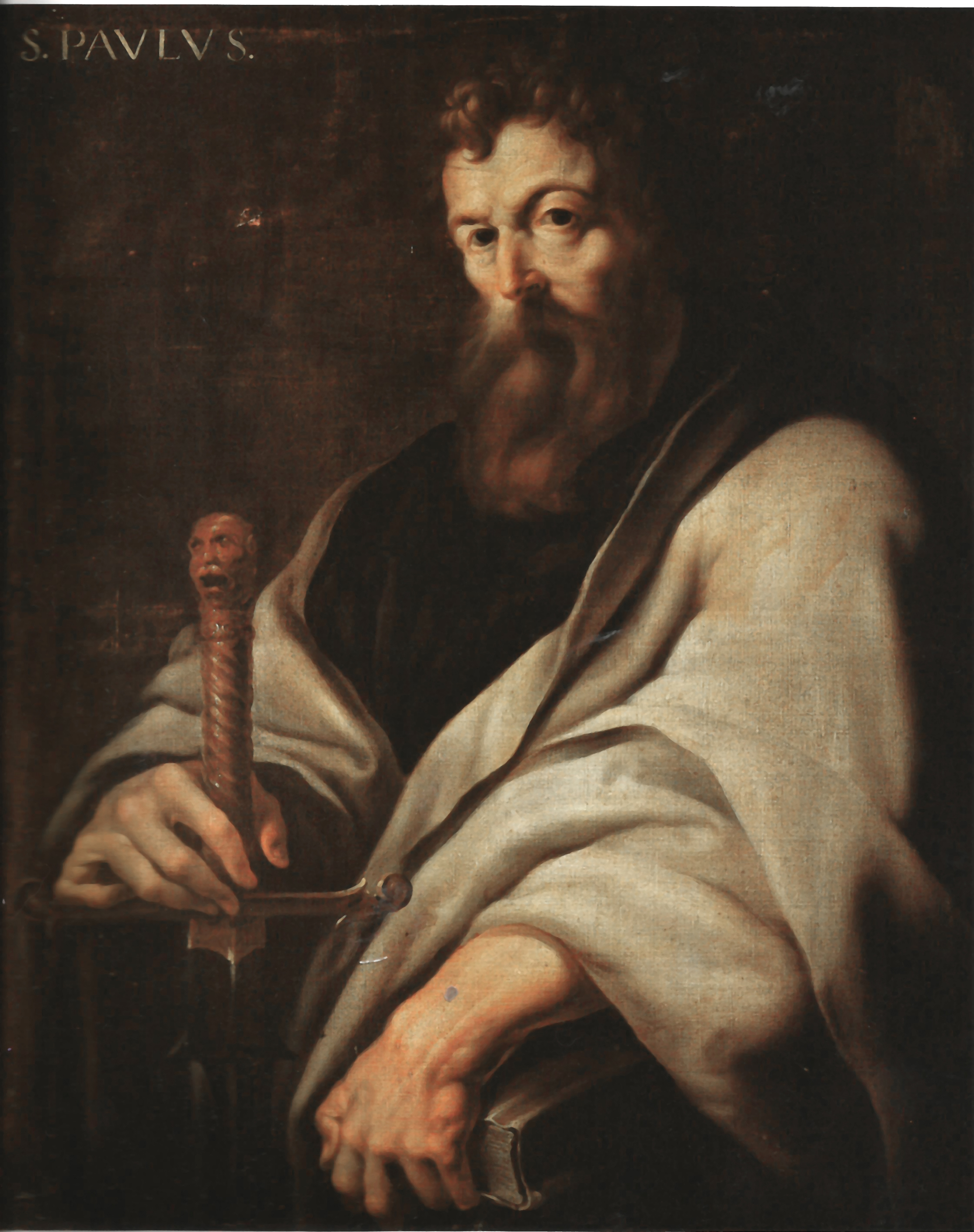
Saint Paul

== See also ==
- Mexican art
- Miguel Cabrera (painter)
- Juan Correa
- Churrigueresque
- Juan Rodríguez Juárez
