= Franz Mayer (disambiguation) =

Franz Mayer (1882–1975) was a German-born Mexican financier and art collector.

Franz Mayer may also refer to:

- August Franz Josef Karl Mayer (1787–1865), German anatomist and physiologist
- Franz Mayer & Co., 19th century Munich stained-glass artist and manufacturer
- Franz Mayer Museum, museum in Mexico City
