= Franz Mayer Museum =

Art museum in Mexico City, Mexico

Coordinates: 19°26′13.61″N 99°8′35.52″W

Museo Franz Mayer
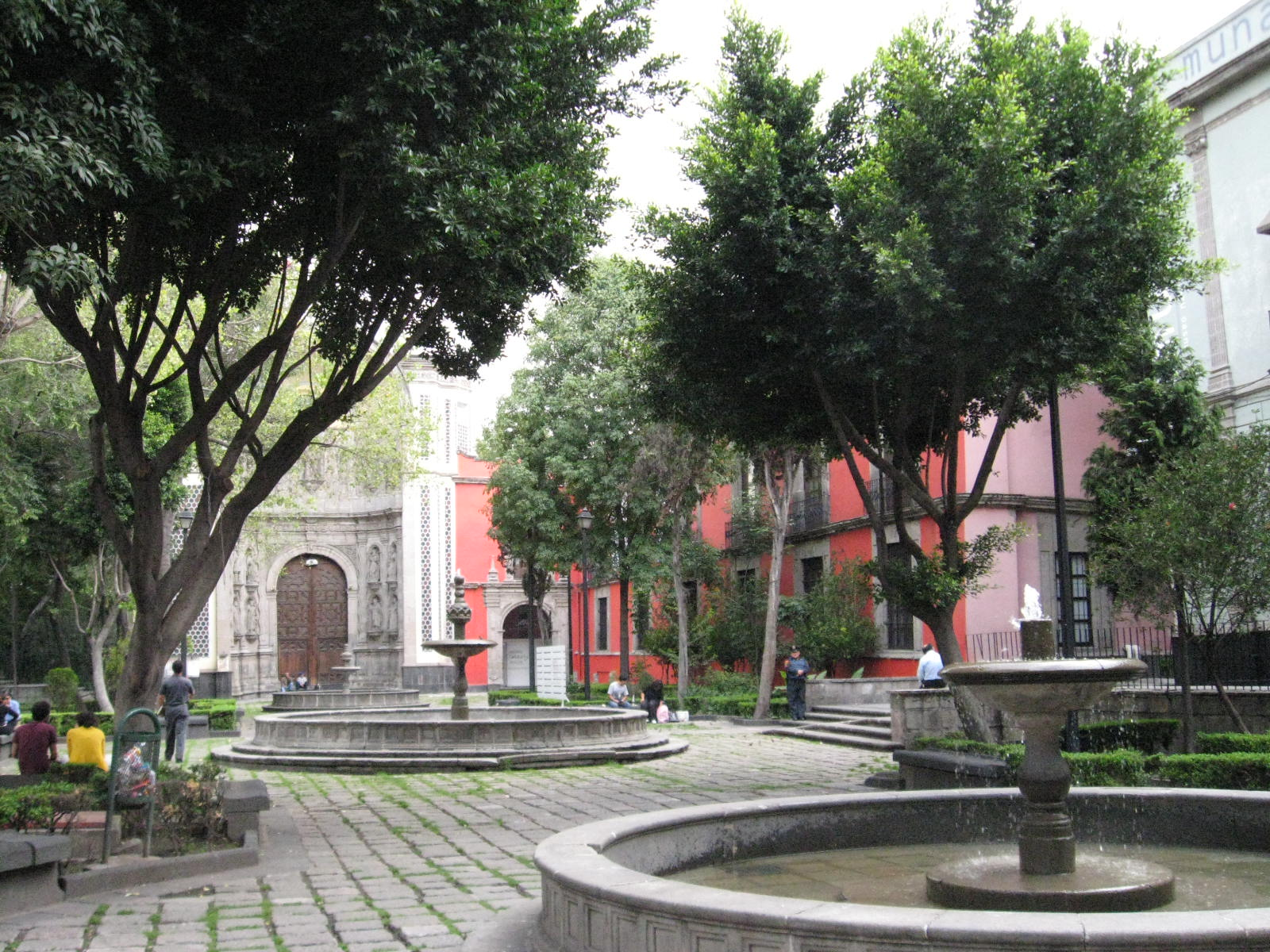
- Courtyard of the Franz Mayer Museum (on right) and one of the entrances of the Parish of La Santa Vera Cruz de San Juan de Dios Church.
- Established: 1986
- Location: Av Hidalgo 45. Centro Histórico 06300, Mexico City, Mwxico
- Director: Lic. Hector Rivero Borrell Miranda
- Website: www.franzmayer.org.mx

The Franz Mayer Museum (Spanish: Museo Franz Mayer), in Mexico City opened in 1986 to house, display and maintain Latin America’s largest collection of decorative arts. The collection was amassed by stockbroker and financial professional Franz Mayer, who collected fine artworks, books, furniture, ceramics, textiles and many other types of decorative items over fifty years of his life. A large portion comes from Europe and Asia but most comes from Mexico itself with items dating from the 15th to the 20th centuries. Many pieces in the collection are fine handcrafts, such as textiles and Talavera pottery, and they are important because they are items that often did not survive because most did not consider them worth preserving.

The museum is housed in the historic center of Mexico City in the former San Juan de Dios monastery and hospital, an 18th-century structure which was rehabilitated for the museum. In addition to displaying the items Mayer collected, of which only over a quarter is visible, the museum still makes acquisitions, hold workshops, sponsors temporary exhibits and has a café located in the center courtyard/garden.

== The institution ==
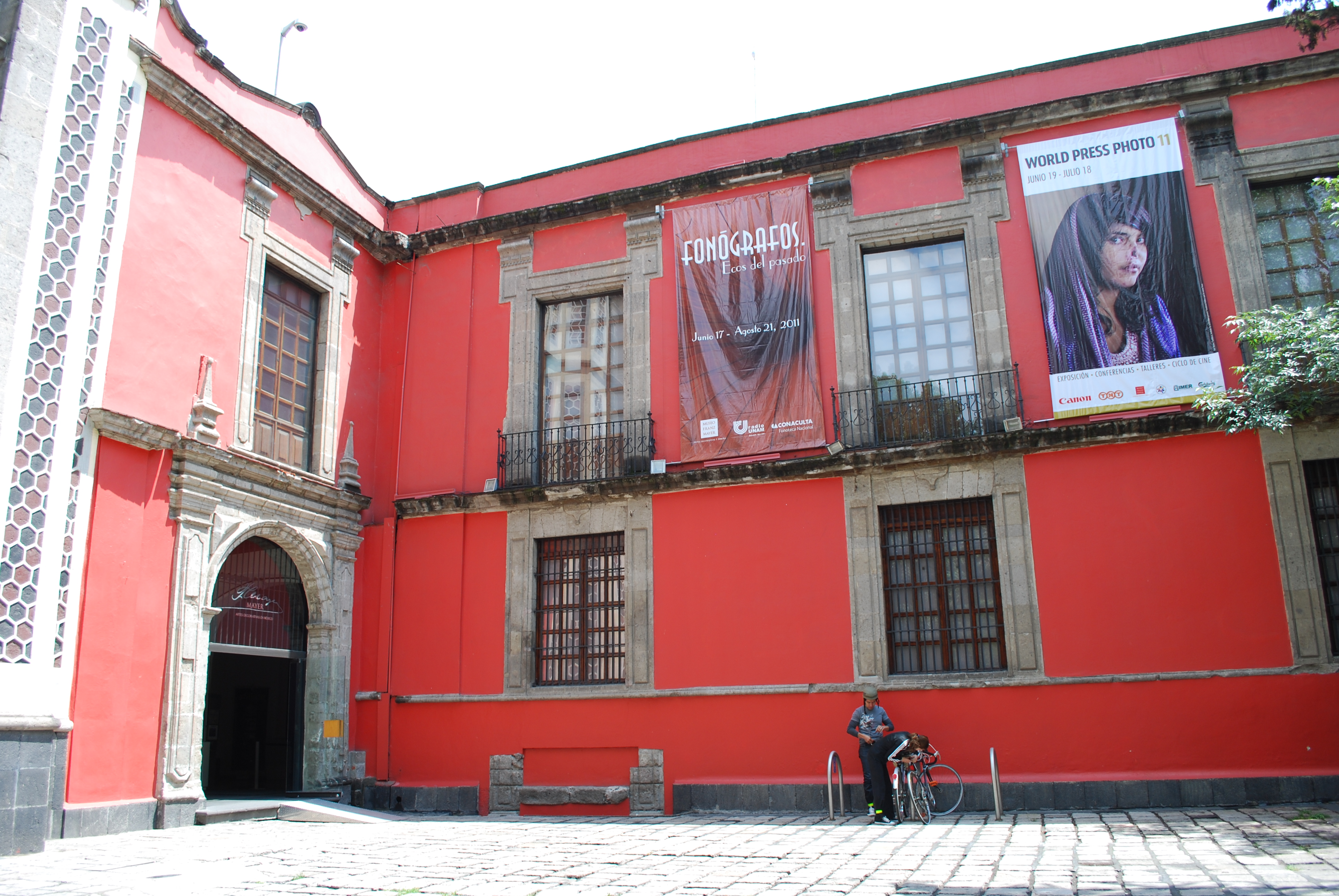
Entrance to the Franz Mayer museum in Mexico City

The museum was founded and continues to operate as a place to house the extensive collection of art and other objects collected by Franz Mayer over fifty years of his life. Before his death in 1975, Franz Mayer set up a trust fund with the Bank of Mexico called the Franz Mayer Cultural Trusteeship. However, the museum was not opened until 1986, eleven years after his demise. It was opened in a former monastery and hospital building which was donated to the museum foundation.

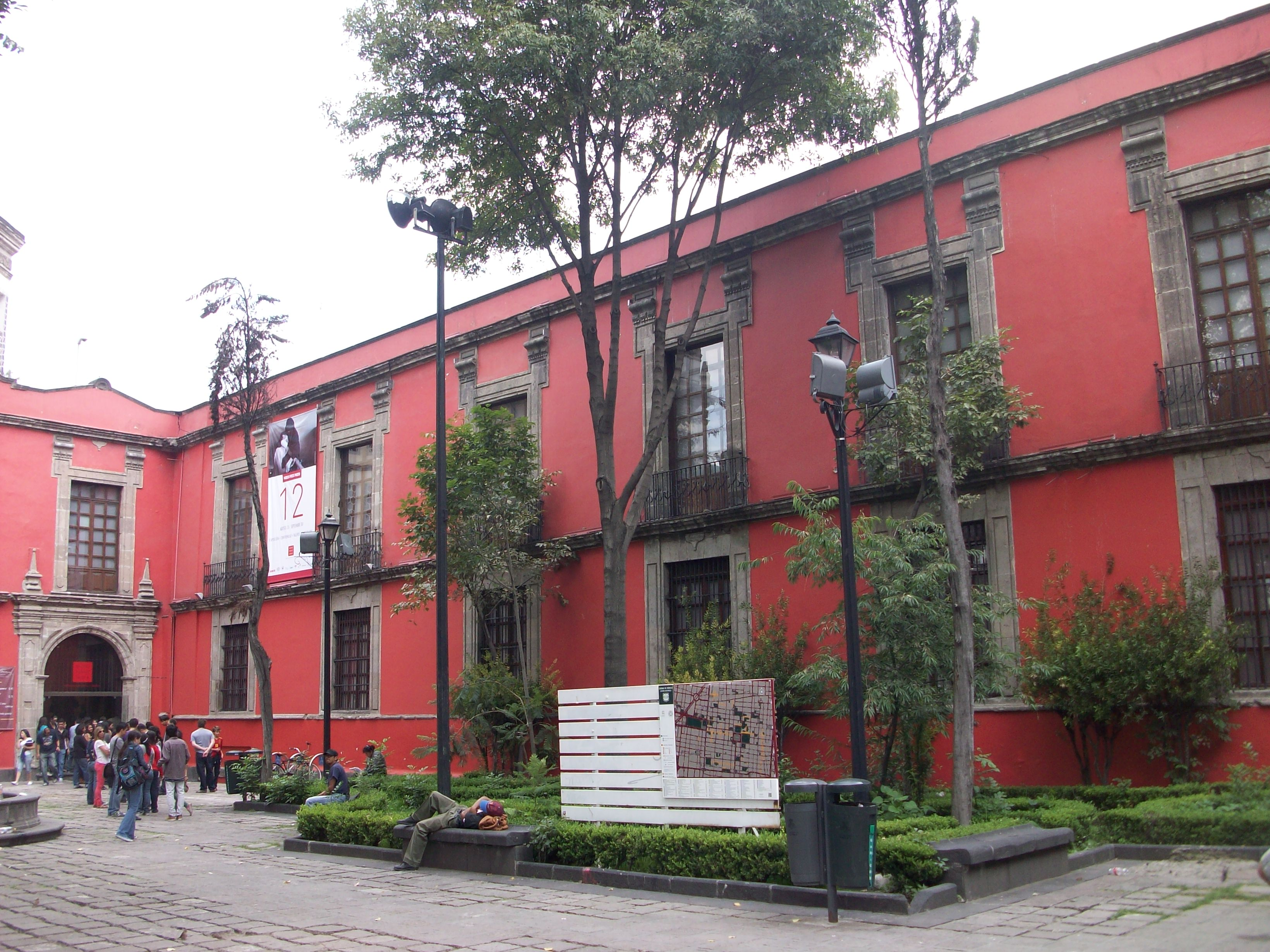
Entrance to the Franz Mayer museum in Mexico City

The permanent exhibitions are still based on Mayer's acquisition although researchers of the institution still look for new acquisitions. One of the latest pieces acquired by the museum is a silver skull from Guatemala . At any time, only just over a quarter of the total collection is on display at the museum, with the rest often sent out on loan to other museums. The museum has plans to expand to a second facility and to have sites in other parts of the country.

The museum studies decorative arts from the past centuries in order to see its effects on contemporary design. The museum has partnerships with modern ceramic and silver artisans to allow them to study the pieces in the collection and to allow for display of new designs and pieces. The museum offers guided tours, courses, lectures, concerts and other performing arts, children's workshops and special activities for members. One of its attractions is its café located in the main courtyard which has been planted with a garden.

The museum hosts frequent temporary exhibits of artwork and other collections. One recent temporary exhibit was a selection of about seventy early 20th century phonographs and other sound reproduction machines restored by engineer Salvador Vélez García. For its 25th anniversary in 2011, the museum inaugurated a temporary exhibit called “Susurros” (Whispers) which is dedicated to the history of the collection. The general director of the museum is Héctor Rivero Borrell.

== The building ==
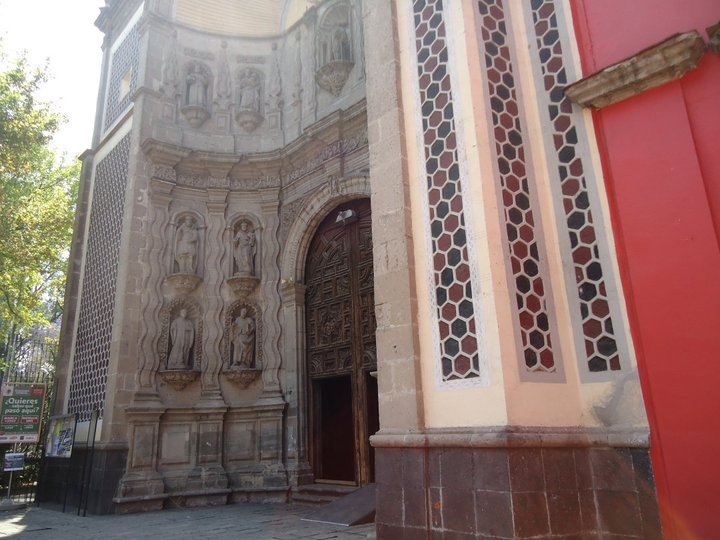
Church Portal next to the entrance of the Museo Franz Mayer

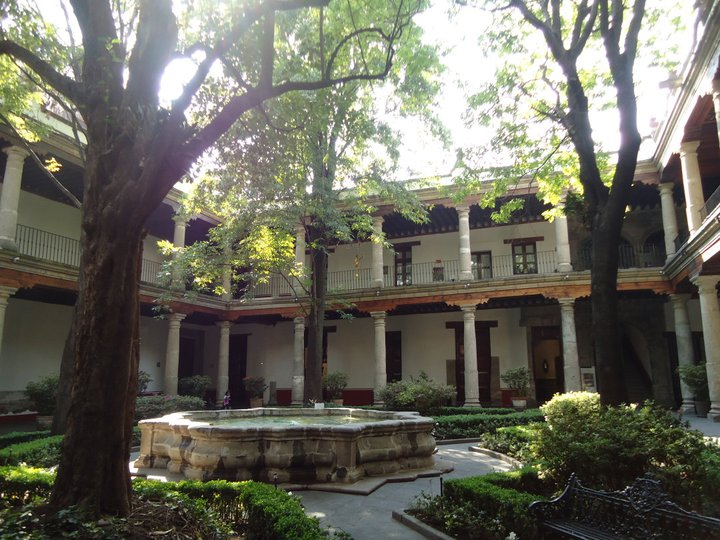
Courtyard of the Museo Franz Mayer

It is located in the Plaza de la Santa Veracruz, next to the Museo Nacional de la Estampa . The building was originally built as a flour mill, then was used as a hospital for about four hundred years. This hospital was founded by Dr. Pedro Lopez in 1582, the first medical doctor to graduate from the Royal and Pontifical University of Mexico. The hospital attended people from almost all of New Spain’s social castes and called the Hospital for the Helpless. The hospital's church was dedicated to the Three Wise Men. The hospital was run by the Lopez family then the Dominicans, than the Brothers Hospitallers of St. John of God, starting in 1604. The current structure was built over most of the 18th century with multiple adaptations and reconstructions since. In 1620, the complex was rebuilt as a church, hospital and monastery. The church's main altarpiece was inaugurated in 1650 and the infirmaries were completed in 1673. The order continued to run the hospital for the next two hundred years despite a fire in 176 and an earthquake in 1800. The Brothers were forced to abandon the complex after Mexico's Independence in 1821. It became a school run by the nuns of the Teaching of the Indies from 1830 to 1834, than the Sisters of Charity occupied it from 1845 to 1873. It began caring for the sick again in 1865, taken over by the Public Benefits Office in 1875 with the name of Morelos Hospital. It remained a hospital under one name or another until the 1960s, when it was used to display handcrafts during the Olympic Games. It would keep this function through the 1970s but in dilapidated condition.

In the 1980s, the idea surged to make it into a museum. The Human Settlements and Public Works Ministry granted occupation of the building to the Franz Mayer Cultural Trusteeship, managed by the Bank of Mexico with the purpose of founding a museum. The current restoration dates from this time. The Franz Mayer Museum was opened to the public in 1986. The museum occupies the former hospital with three of the original rooms of the cloister: a dining hall, a storage room and a chapel restored to its colonial look.

== The collection ==
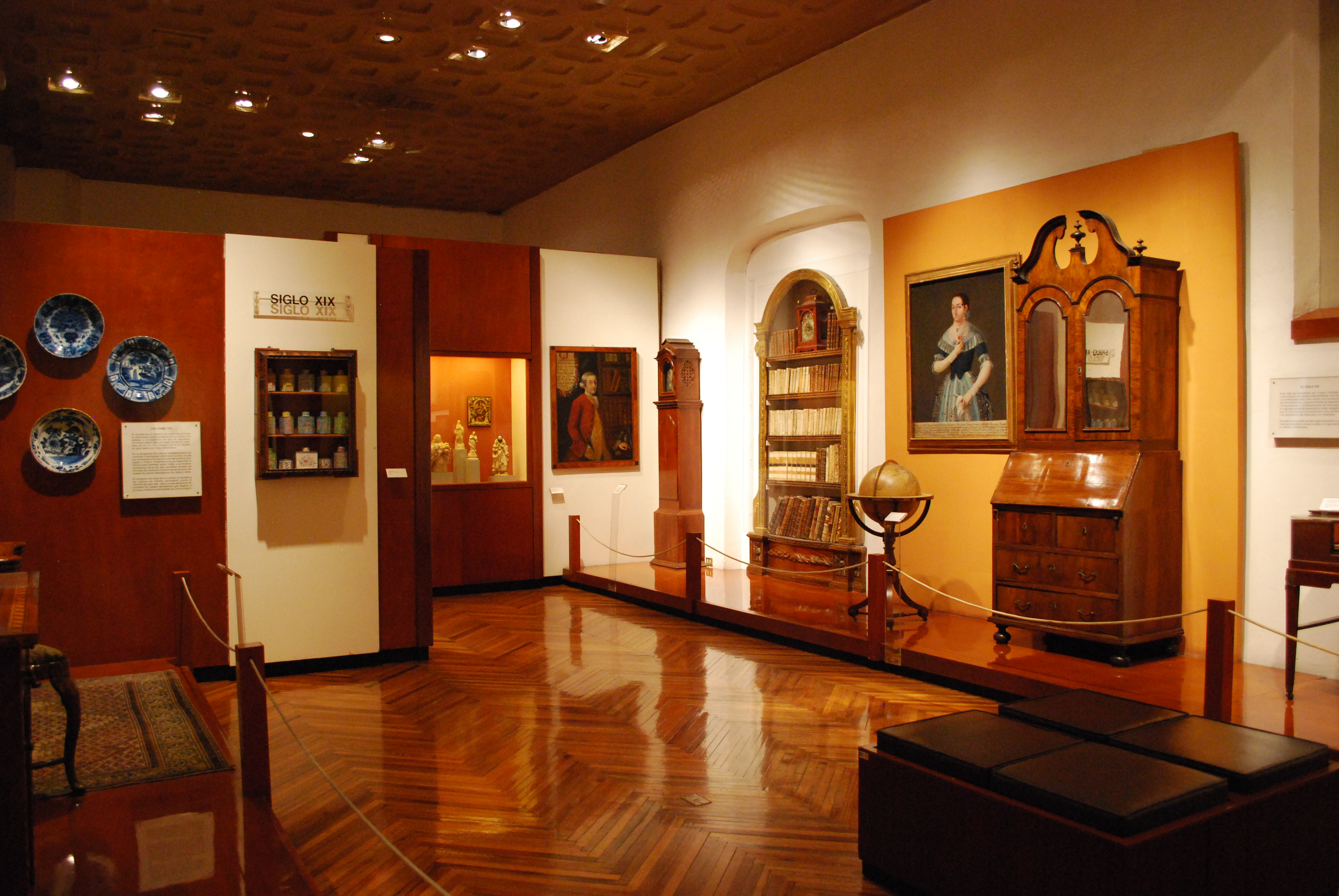
One of the upstairs display areas at the Franz Mayer Museum in Mexico City

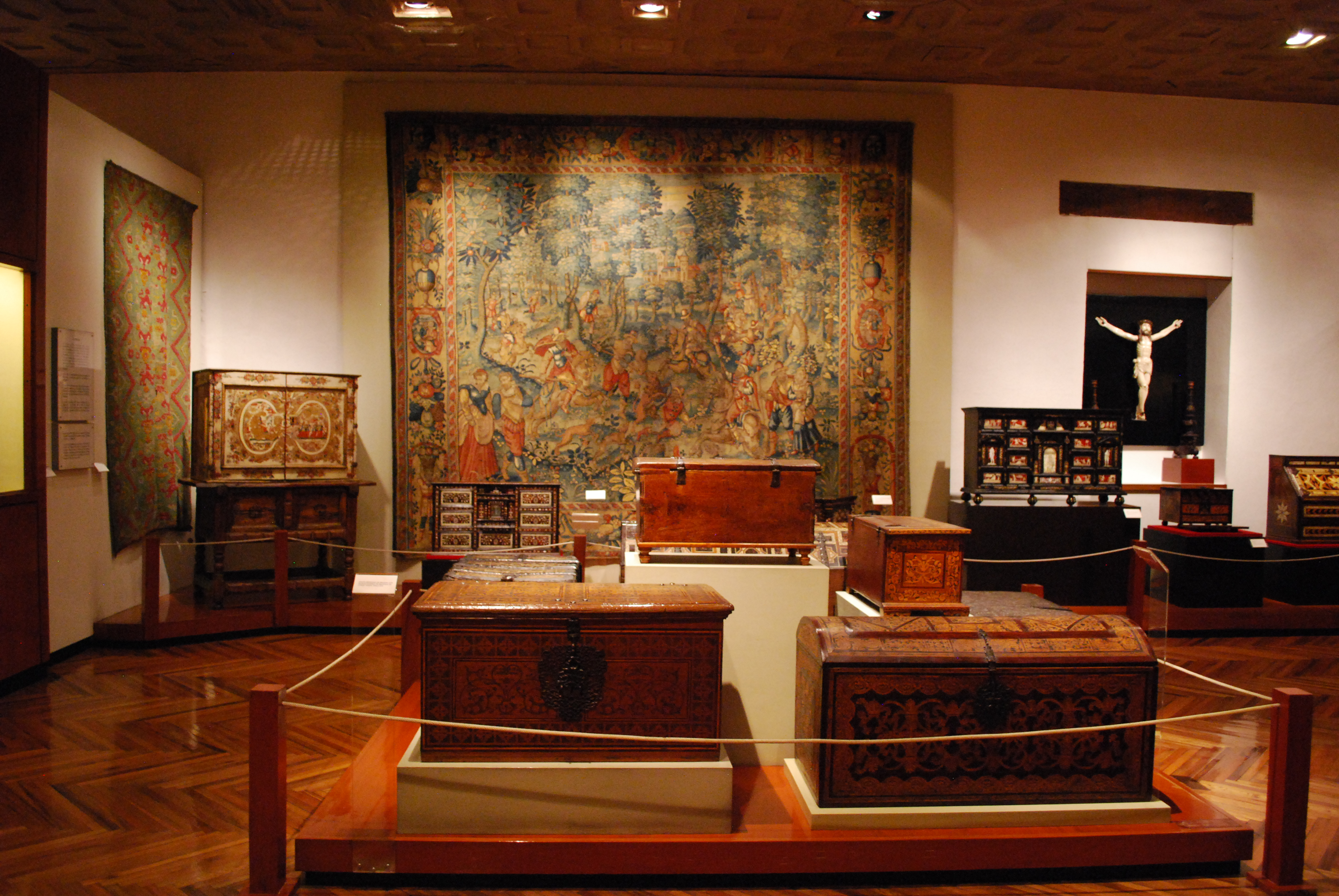
One of the display areas in the museum

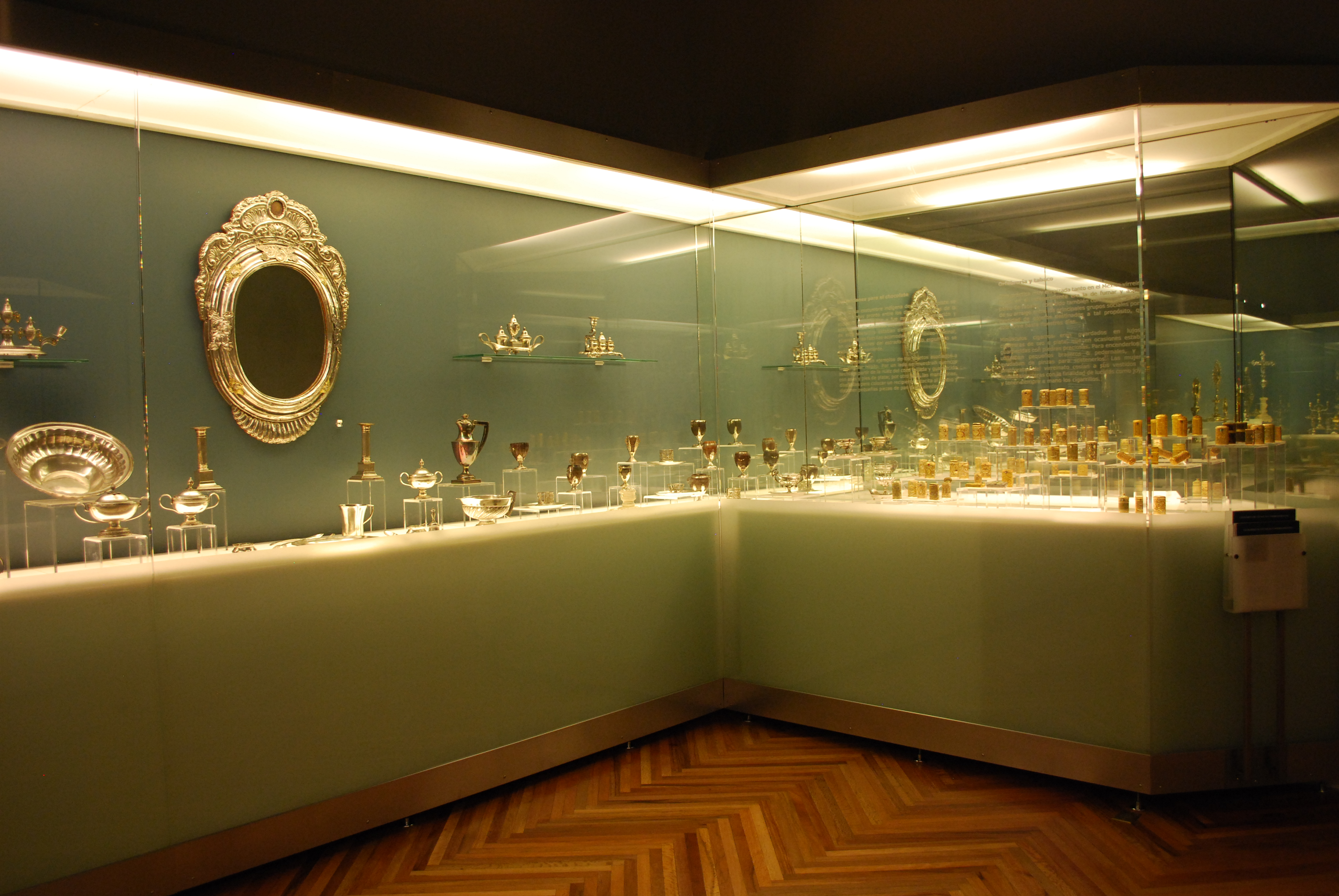
One of the displays of silver items

The collection of the museum is mostly that of Franz Mayer himself, collected over the course of fifty years and is the largest collection of decorative arts in Latin America. The museum has 9,500 pieces of art, 1,400 pieces of ceramics and 10,000 books, with only 28% able to be shown at any time in the museum proper. The collection includes silverwork, ceramics, furniture, textiles, fine arts and decorations made of pre Hispanic style feather work, lacquer, ivory, shell, glass and enamel, mostly of pieces from the 16th to the 19th centuries with a variety of places of origin, materials and styles. Most of the pieces are those used in everyday life, but finely handcrafted. A number of pieces come from Europe and Asia, but Mayer acquired a very large quantity of pieces from Mexico City, Puebla and Guanajuato. The collection of textiles is one of the most important in the country for its variety with about 260 pieces from the 15th to the 20th centuries. Many of his items are those which were susceptible to disappearing as they are everyday items often not considered worth preserving.

The furniture collection is one of the richest in Mexico for its variety. The museum houses 710 pieces which date from the 16th to the 20th centuries. Most are from Mexico's colonial period although there are pieces from Europe and Asia.

The silver collection contains just under 1,300 pieces from the 15th to 19th centuries, and is recognized as one of the most important in Mexico. The pieces include repoussé work, chiseling, graffito and filigree, along with pieces set with precious and semi-precious stones and those containing enamels and others with gold. Most are pieces related to Catholic liturgy and include censers, chalices, lamps, candlesticks, ciboriums, crosses and tabernacles, but there are also non-religious pieces such as gold cigarette cases, cutlery, plays and trays.

The textile collection is one of the most varied in Mexico, standing out as one of few collections in the country with significant samples. Much of the current collection consists of recent acquisitions, but it began with Mayer collecting rebozos, then blankets from Saltillo, Flemish tapestries, shawls from Manila, dresses and liturgical garments. Mexican textiles include those from the colonial period made on backstrap as well as European pedal looms. There are also pieces with fine embroidery including the use of gold and silver thread. Many of the rugs are from Europe and Spain but with Oriental motifs.

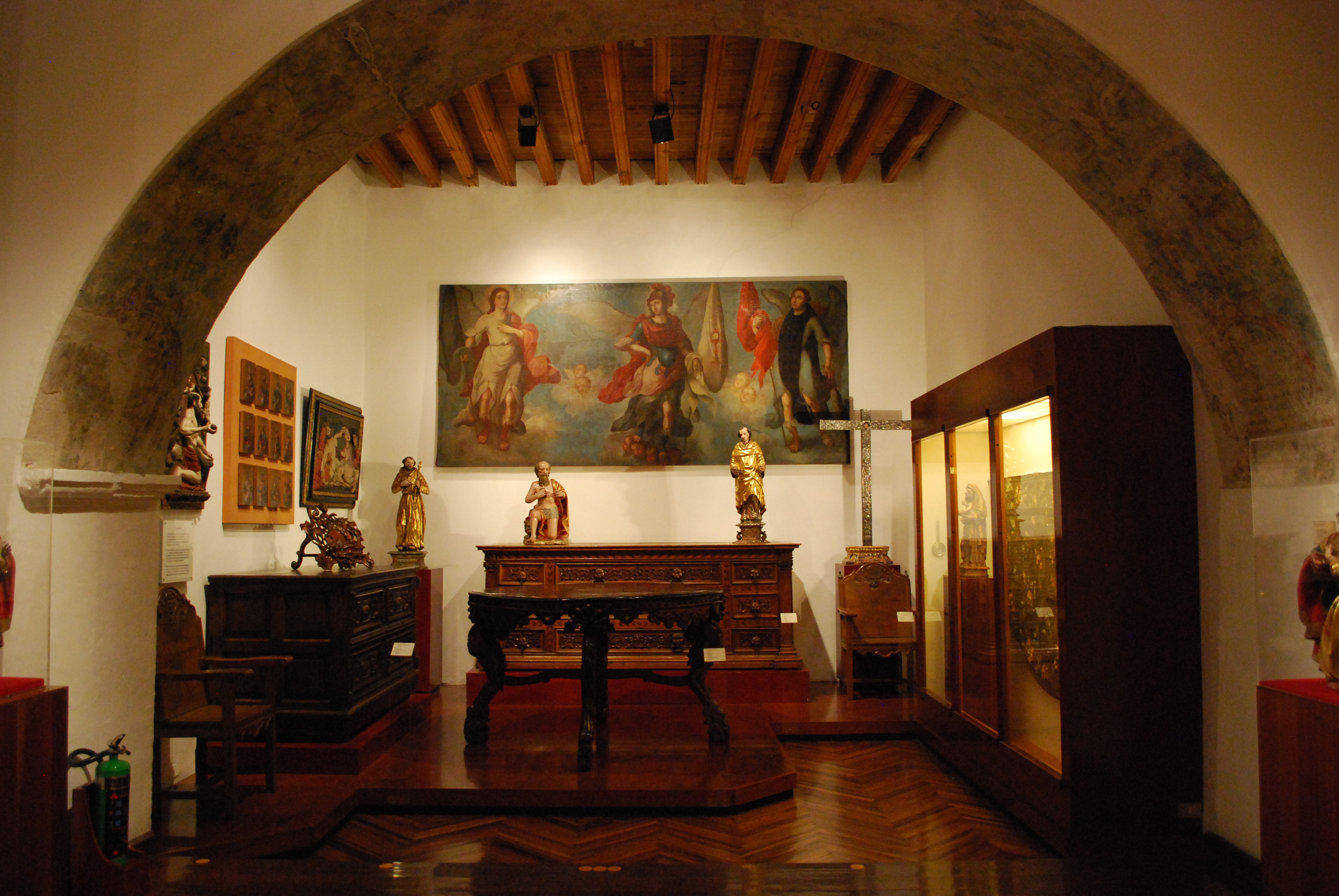
Small room with religious items at the museum

The museum is one of the few places where European and Mexican painting is displayed together. European works date back as far as the 14th century, with those from Spain dating from the 14th to the 20th centuries. These include works by José de Ribera “El Españoleto”, Francisco de Zurbarán, and Ignacio Zuloaga. Italian art is represented by works by Lorenzo Lotto, and Alessandro Allori. Northern European painters include Jacob Grimmer and Bartholomeus Bruyn. Mexican works are mostly from the colonial period and include pieces by Juan Correa, Miguel Cabrera, Juan and Nicolás Rodríguez Juárez and others. Almost of these are religious in nature, with a few portraits from the 18th century. Post colonial works include a landscape by José María Velasco and an early painting by Diego Rivera .

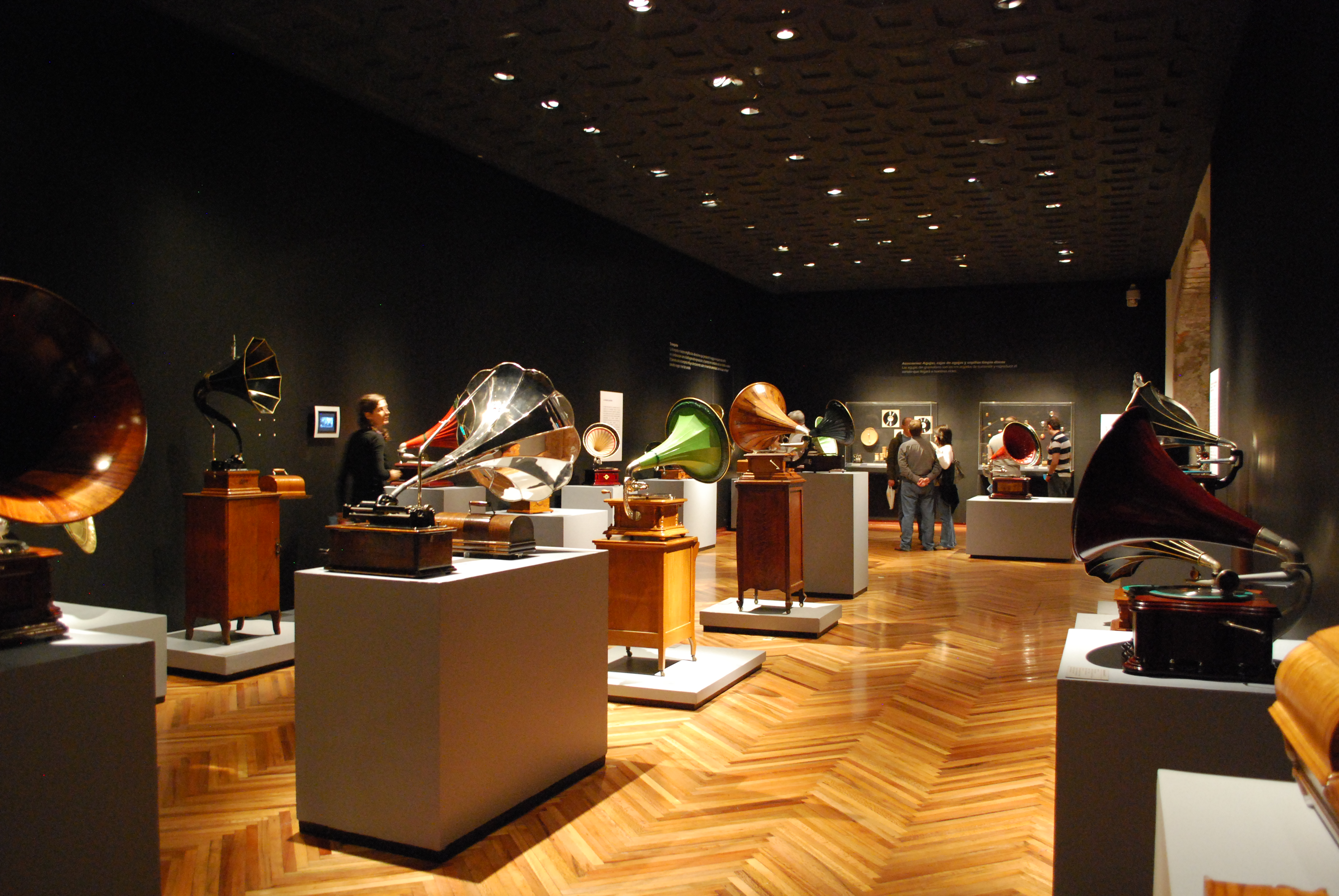
Display of antique phonographs restored by Salvador Velez on display at the Franz Mayer Museum in Mexico City.

In the 1920s, Mayer began collecting Talavera pottery from Puebla, one of the first collectors to do so. In Puebla, he was considered a bit crazy for buying all of the "old stuff" from the locals. The museum opened with the largest Puebla Talavera collection in the world with 726 pieces from the 17th to the 19th centuries and some 20th-century pieces by Enrique Luis Ventosa.

One important part of the museum complex is the Rogerio Casas-Alatriste H. Library, named after the first director. It is dedicated to Mayer's book collection most of which were bought to research pieces which Mayer had bought or was interested in. The library is in the cloister area, containing with over 14,000 volumes, which includes 800 different editions of Don Quixote and the Chronicles of Nuremberg, edited in 1493. The interior of the library is a Classical design with shelving made of cedar to protect the books. The wood floor of the library was that of the Mayer's original house as well as the terrarium and the candelabra .

In 2004, anthropologist Ruth D. Lechuga donated her private collection of artifacts and personal items to the museum. The collection contained over 14,000 artifacts, 5,000 books and magazines and 1,000 personal effects documenting Lechuga's life from her family's flight from the Nazi Anschluss in her native Austria to the years dedicated to the research on Mexico's indigenous populations. Anthropologists Marta Turok and Margarita de Orellana are the co-executors of the collection, which has been shown in several exhibits. In 2016, the Ruth D. Lechuga Center for Popular Art Studies (Spanish: Centro de Estudios de Arte Popular Ruth D. Lechuga (CEAP-RDL)) opened in the basement of the museum.

== Gallery ==
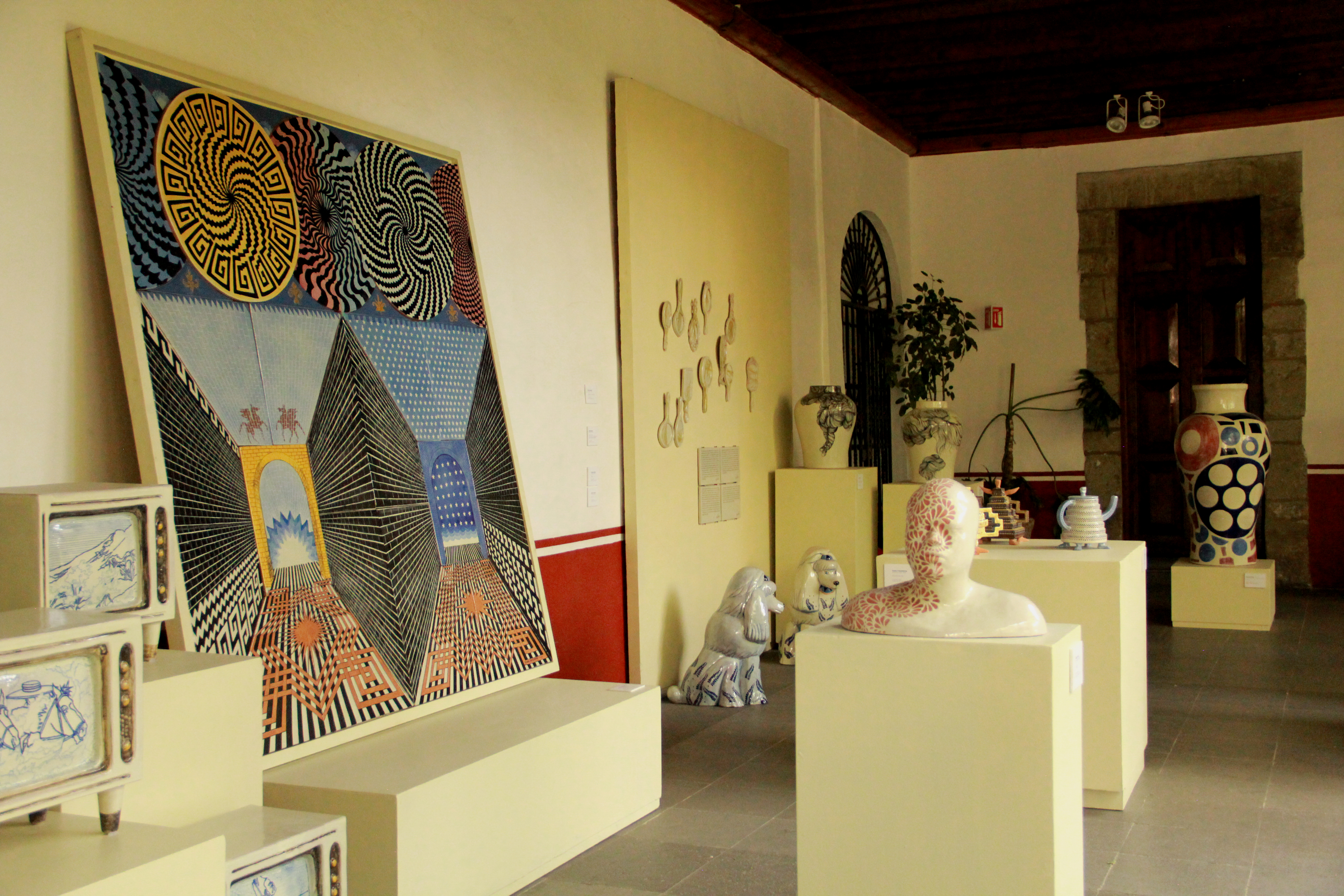

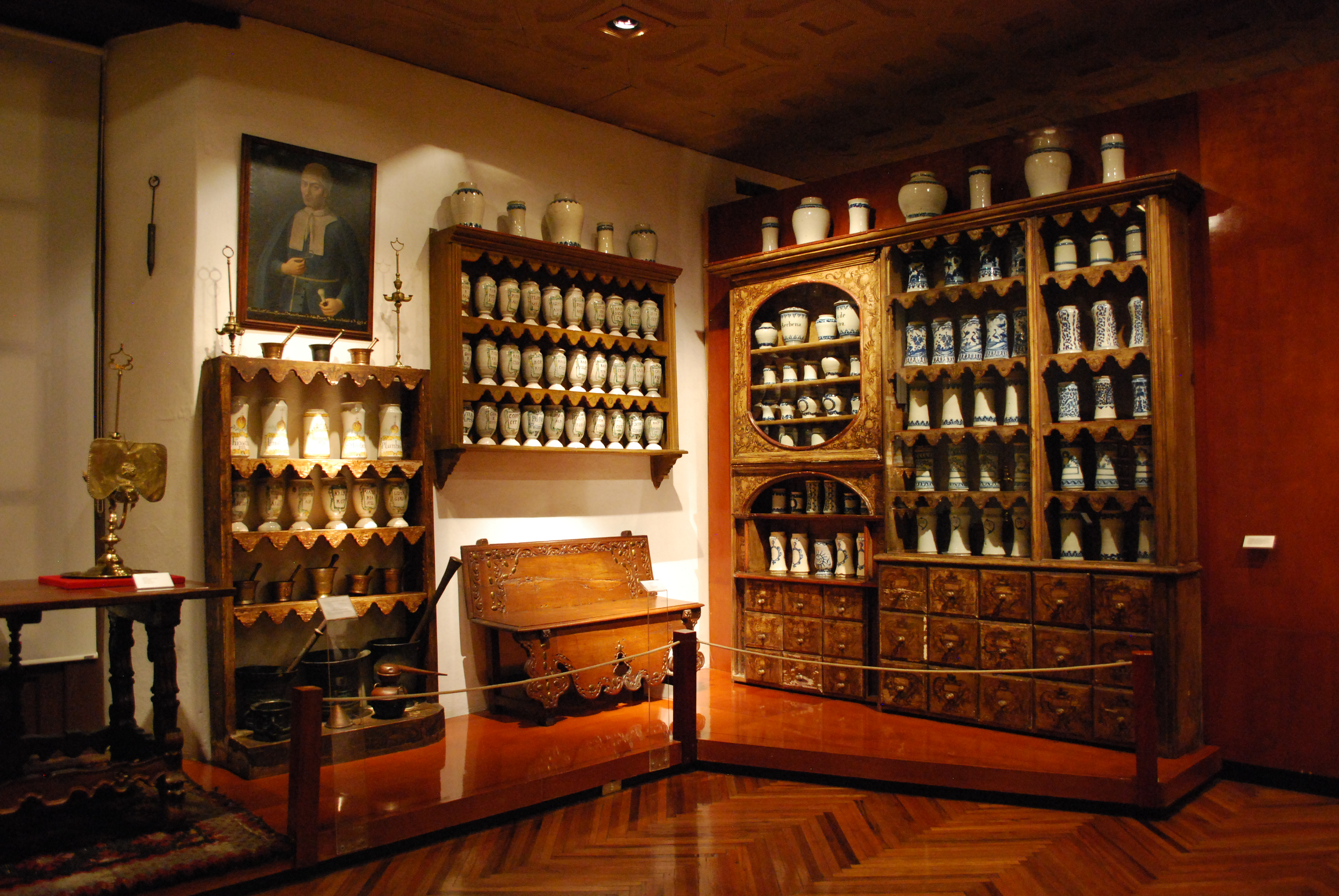

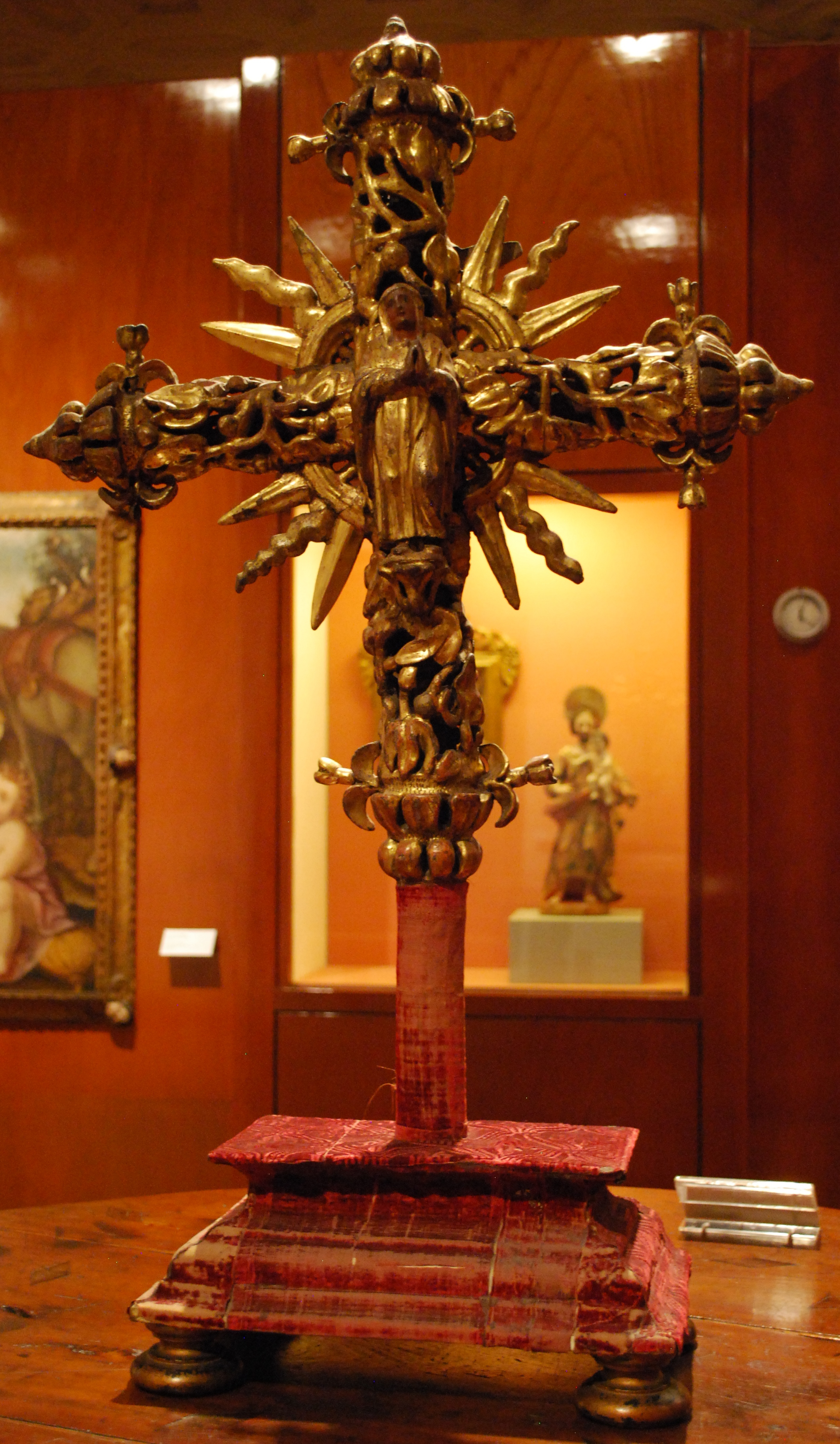

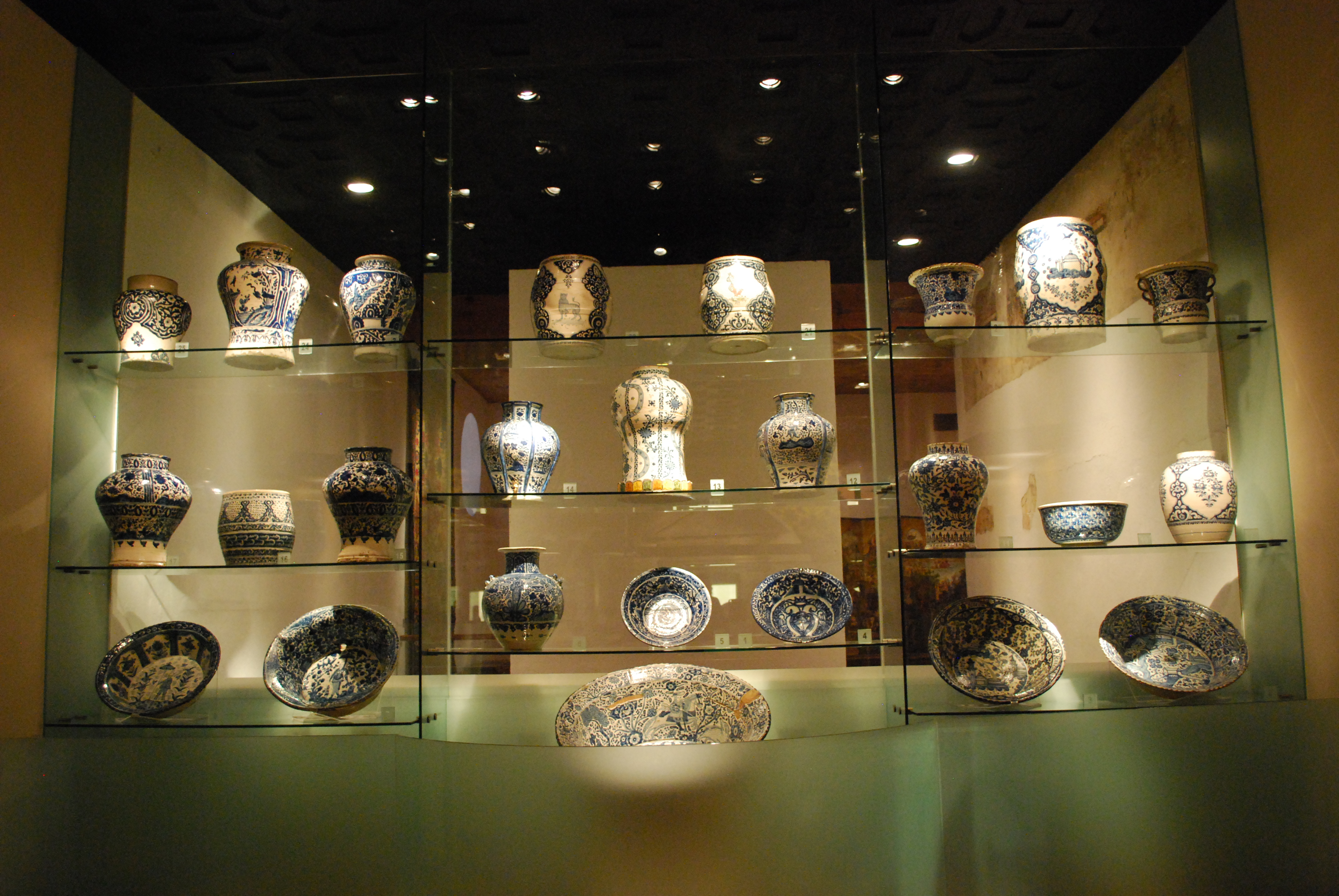

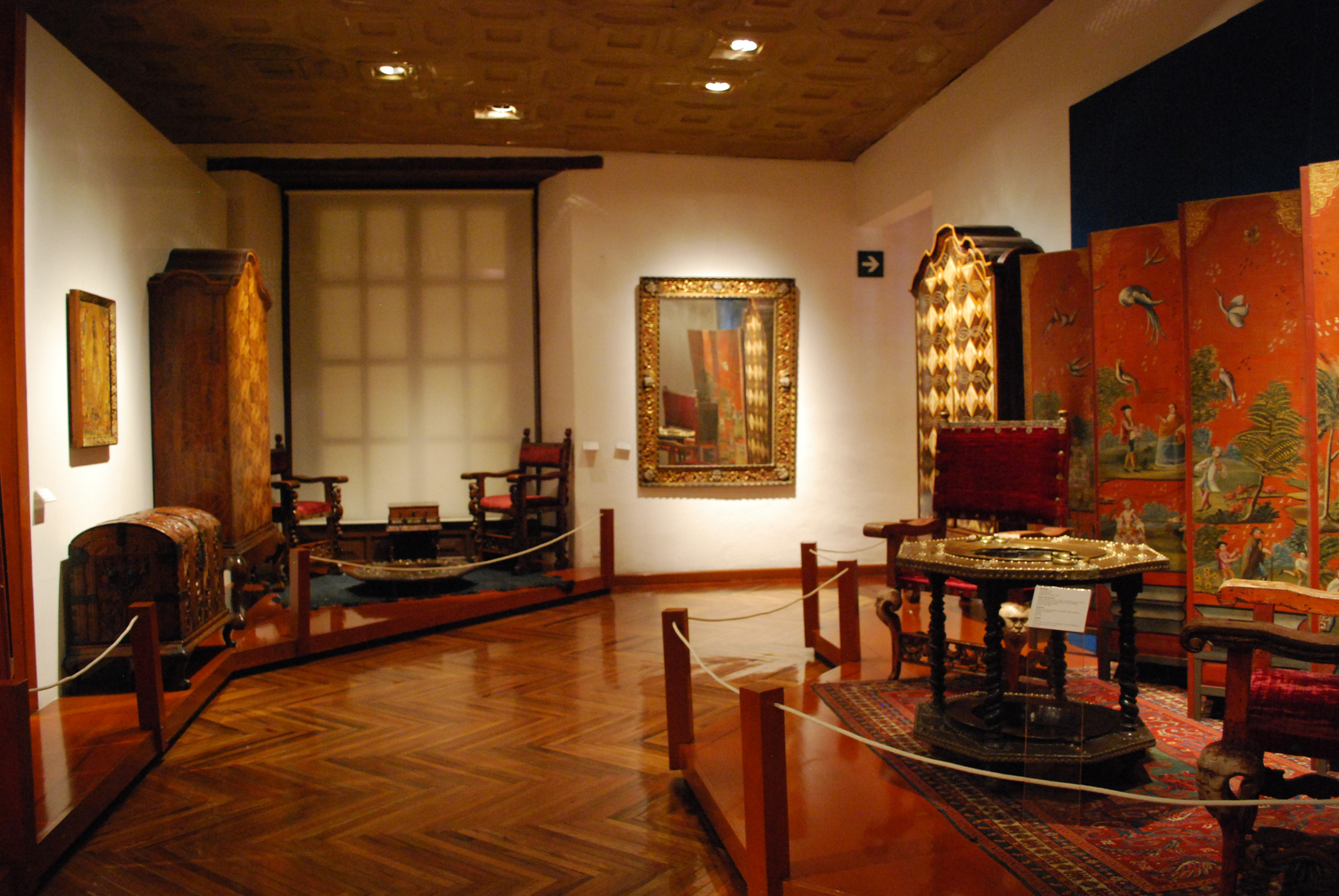

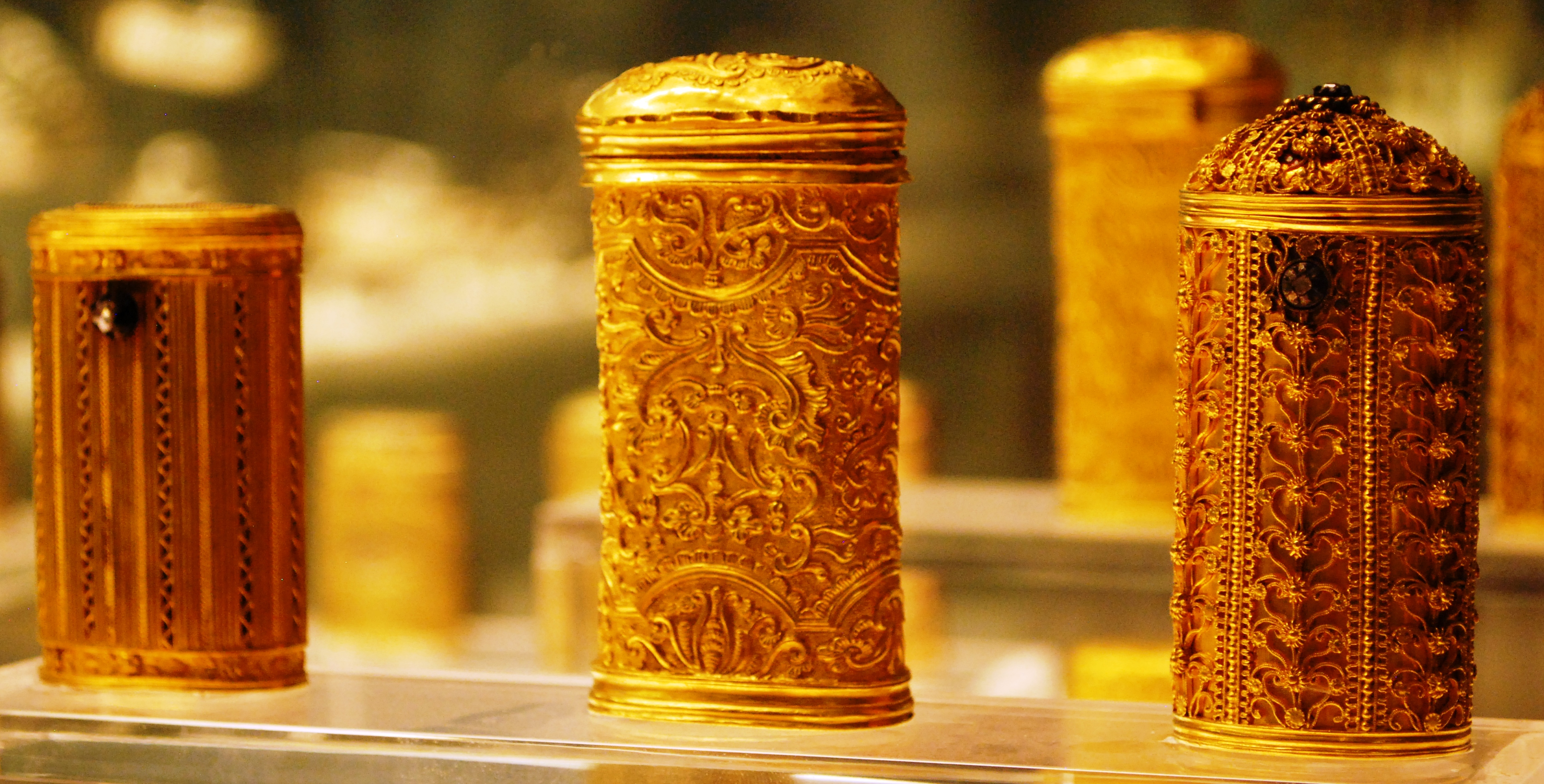

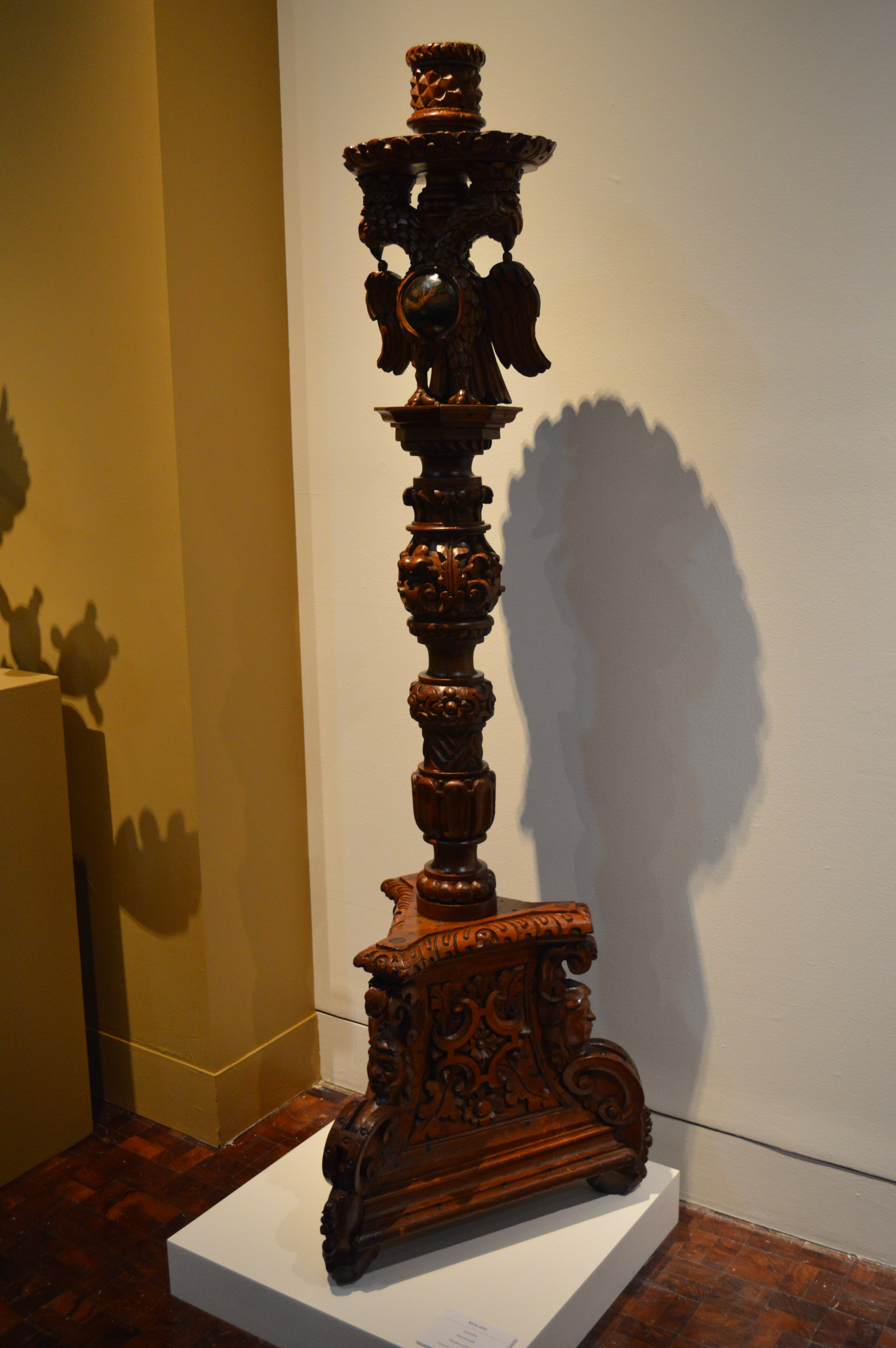

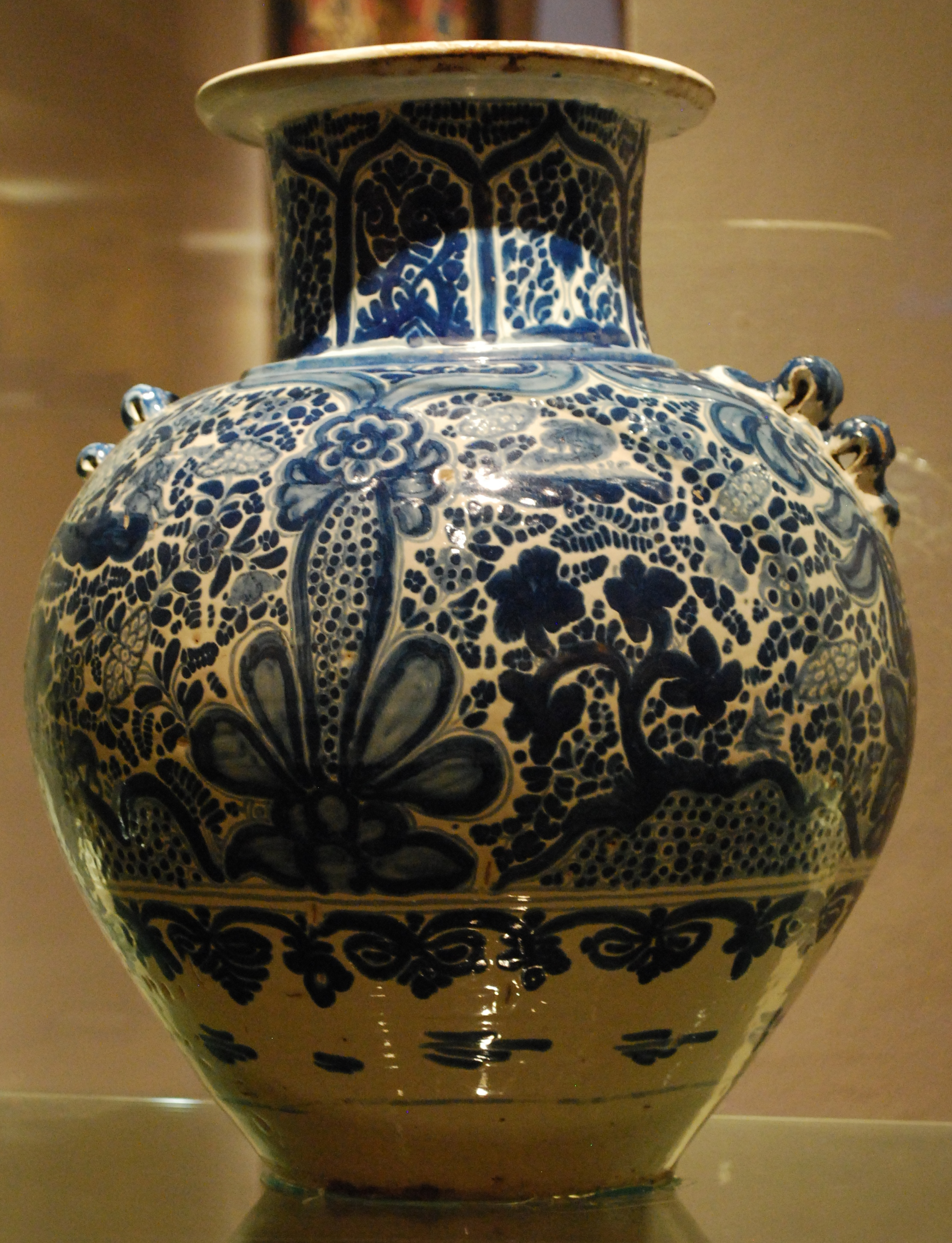

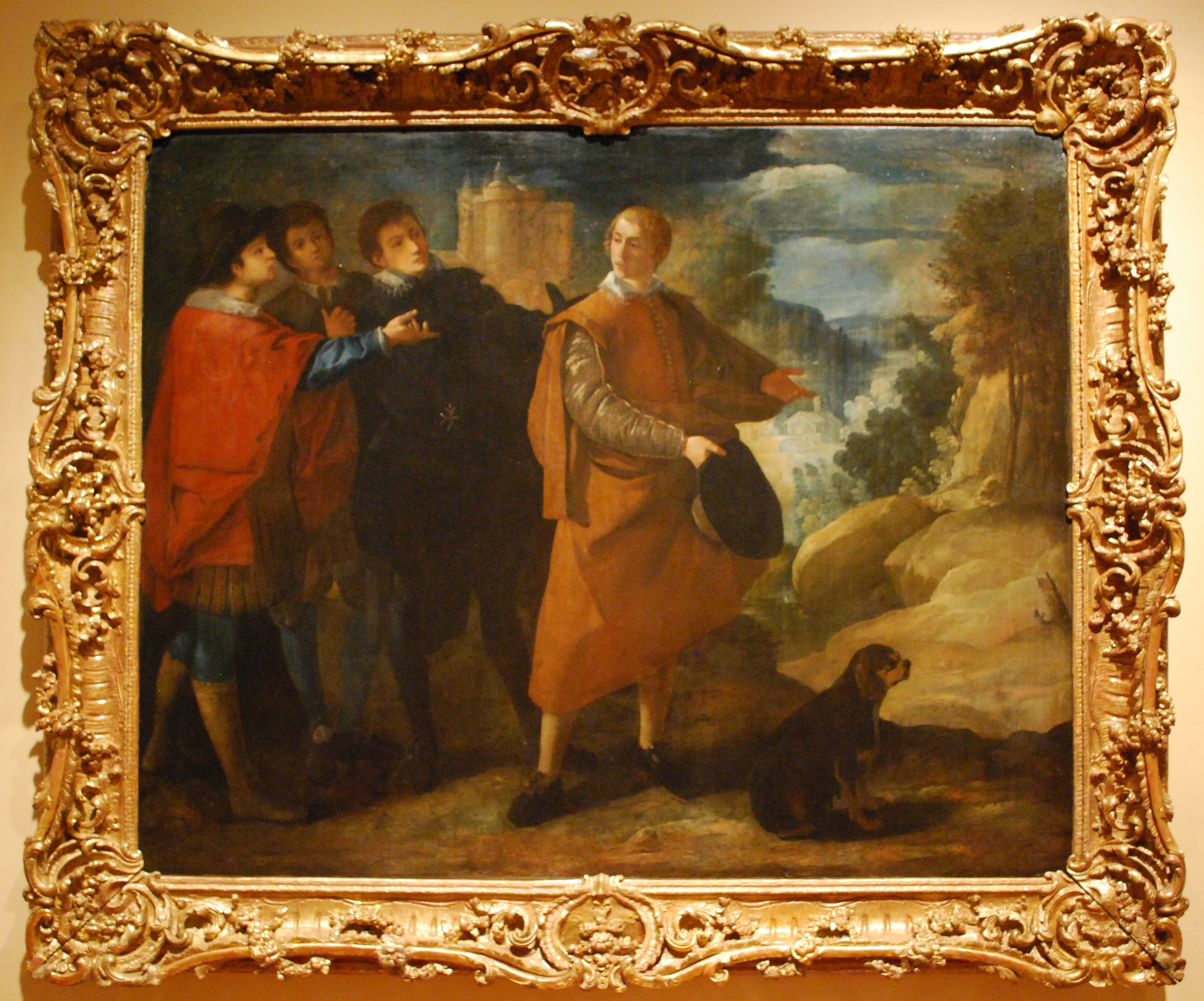

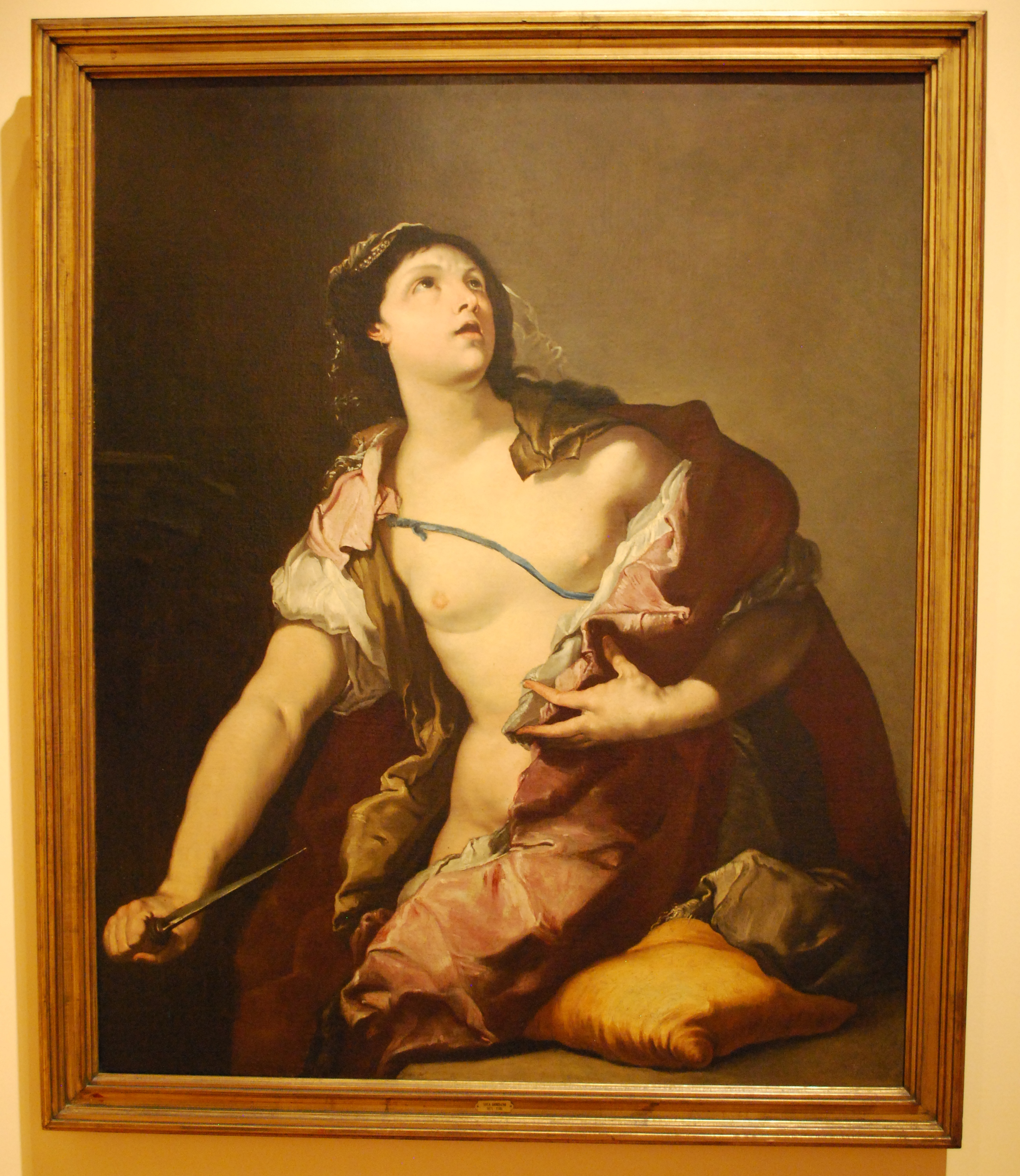

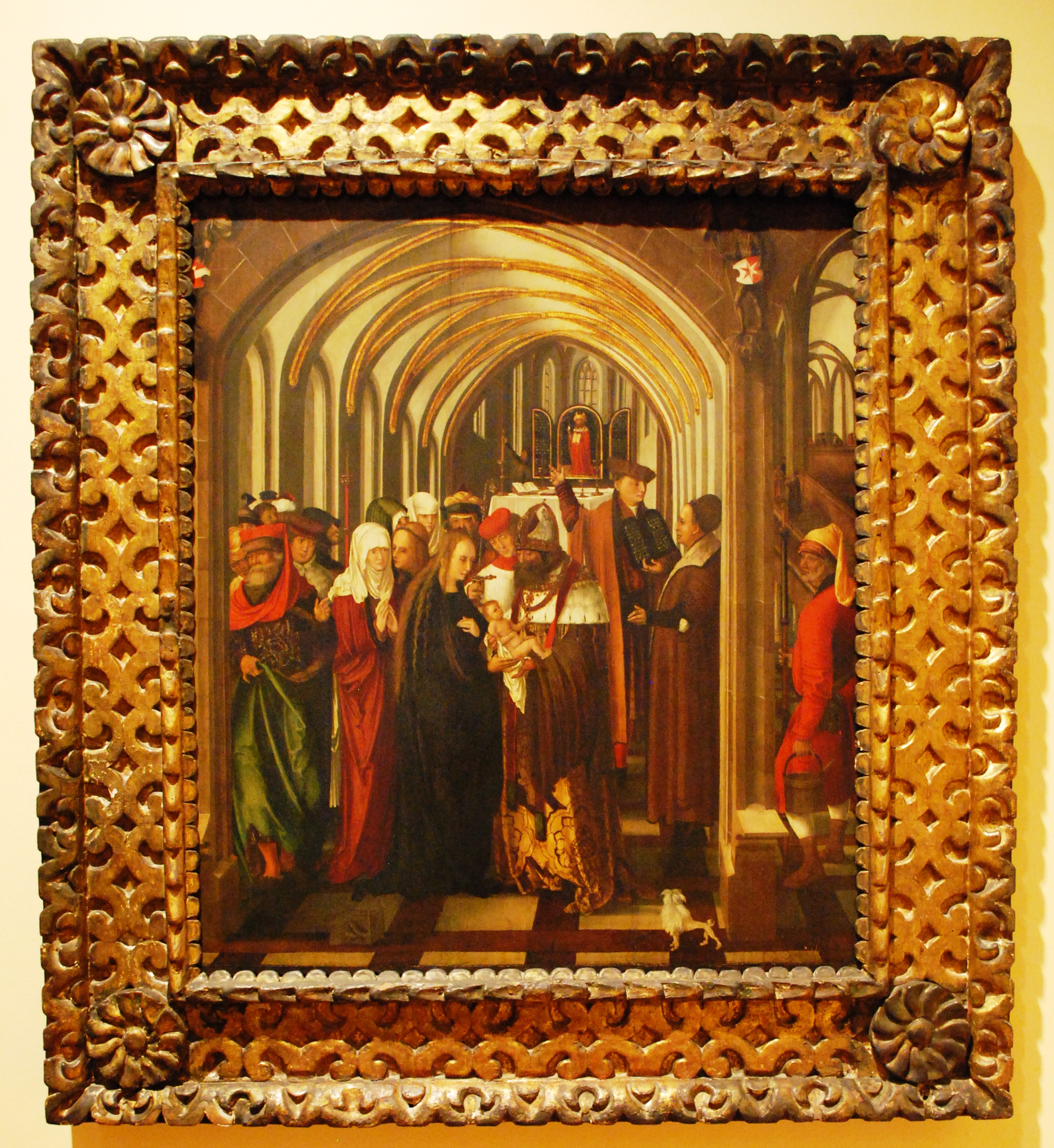

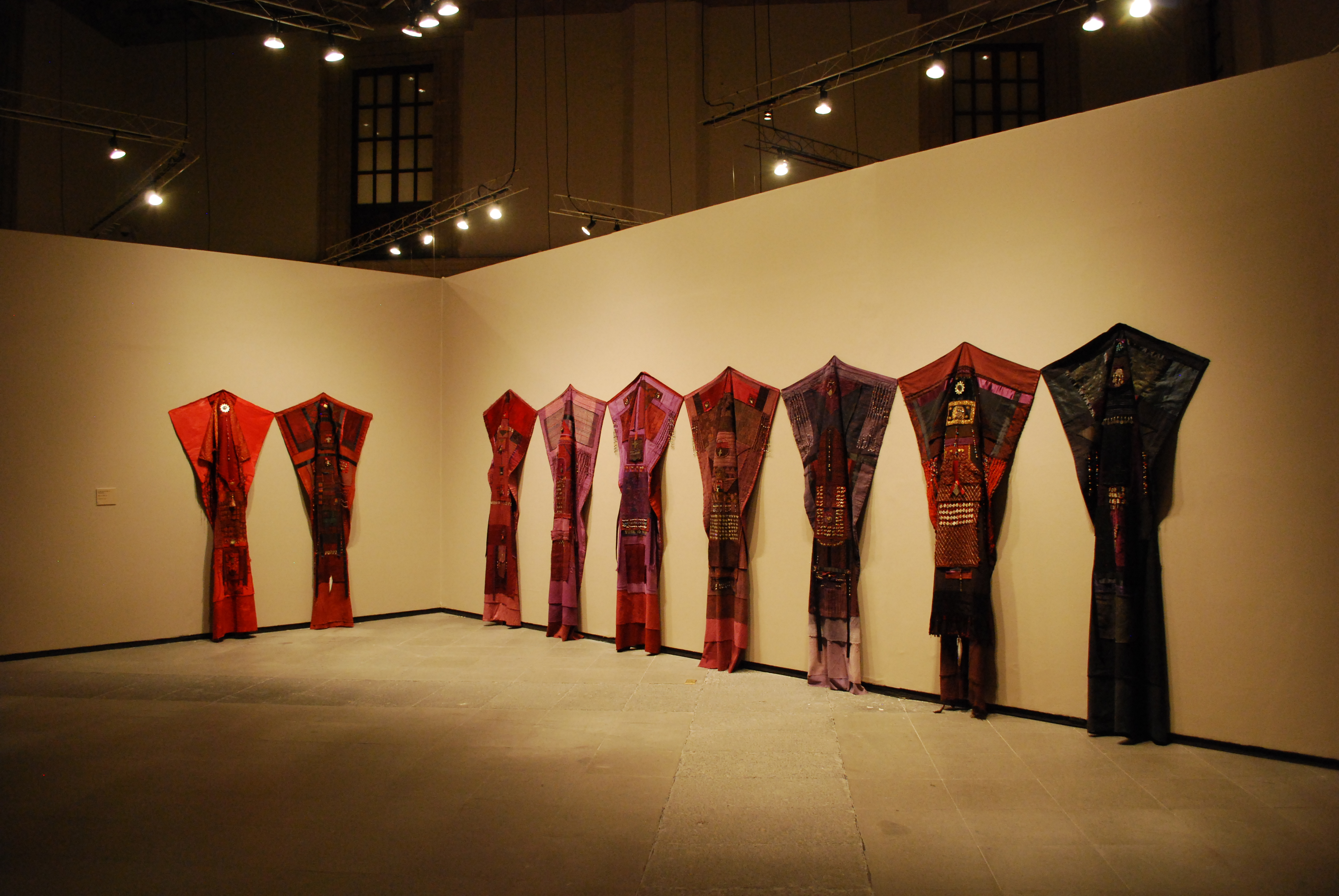

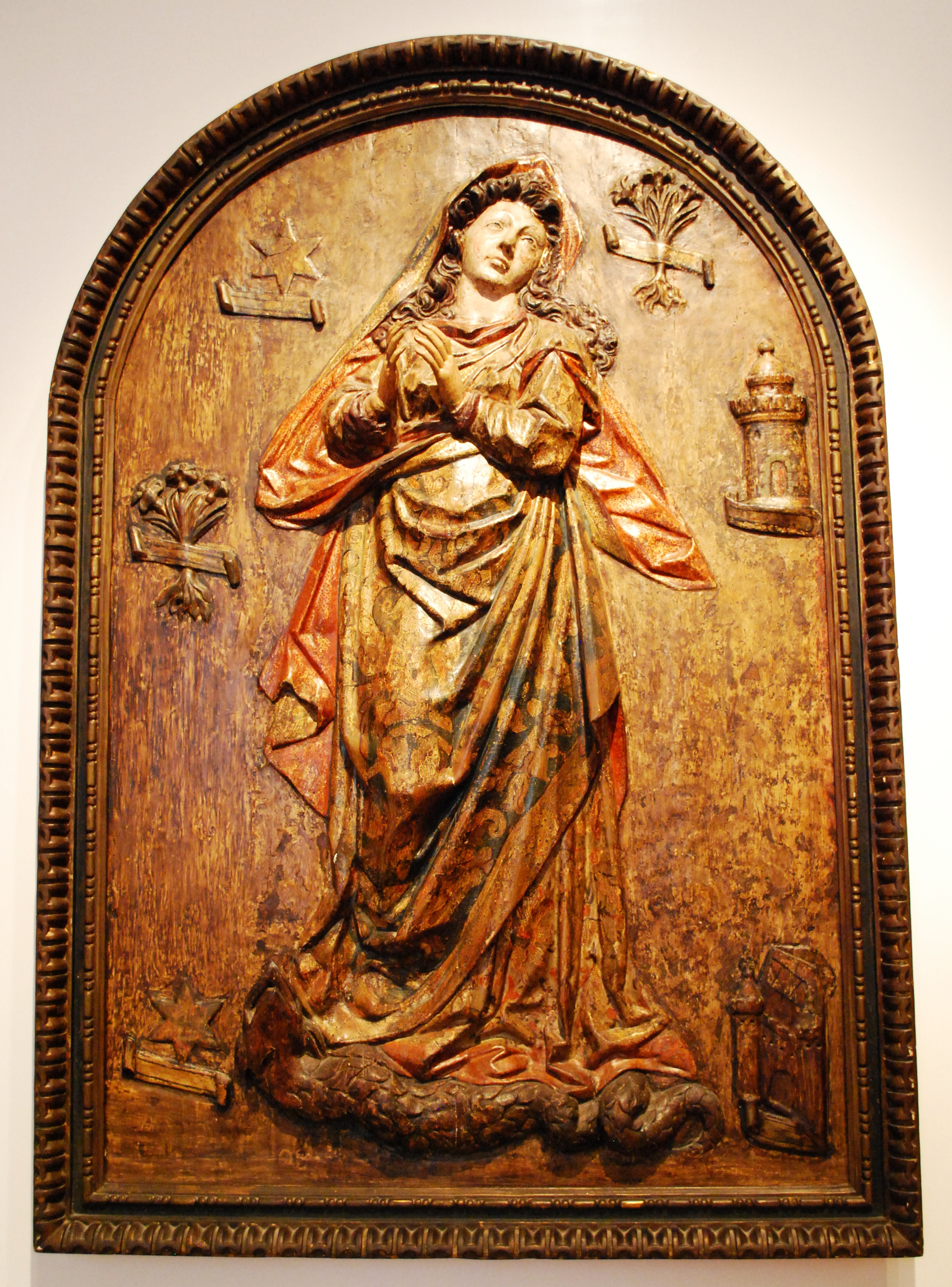

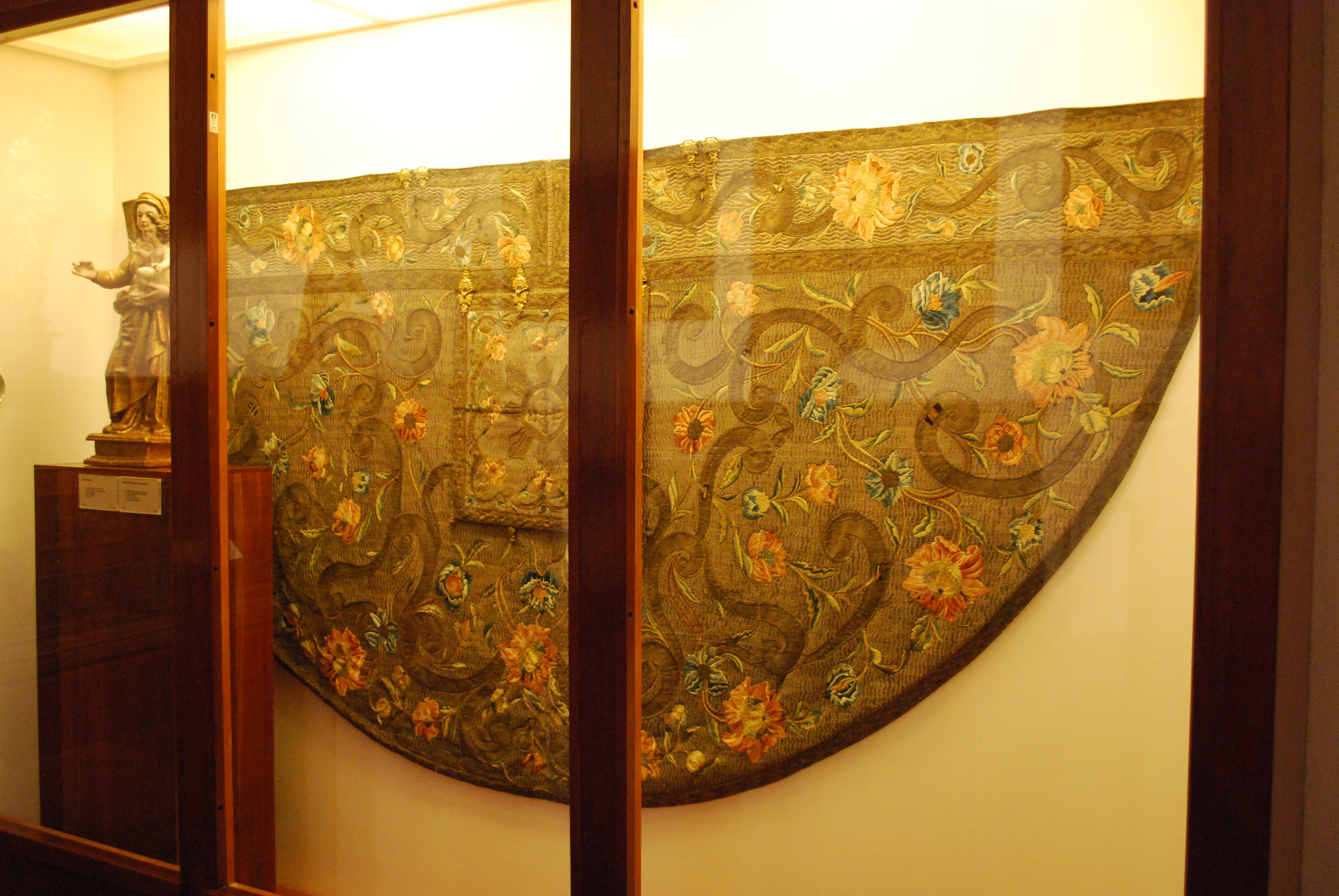

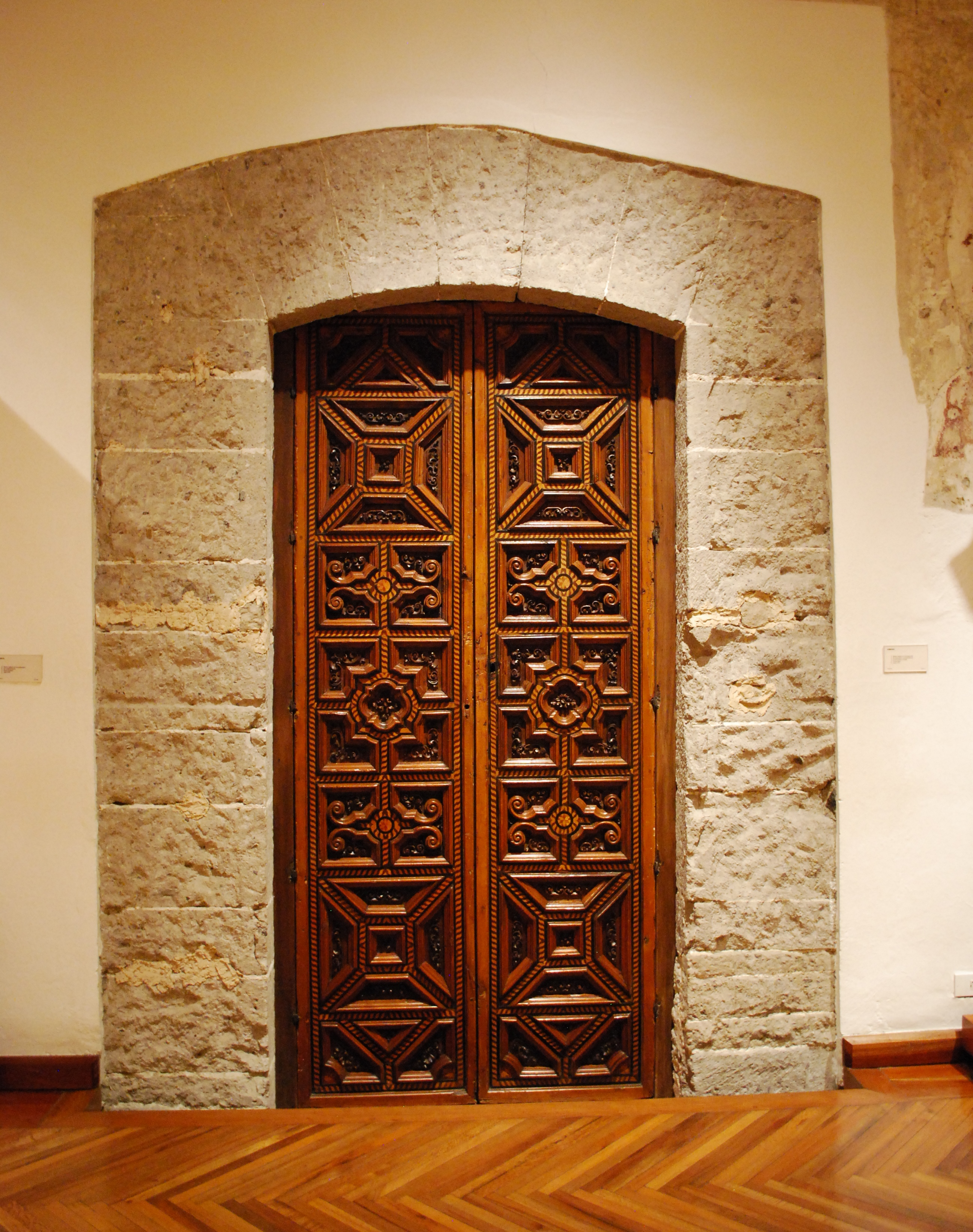

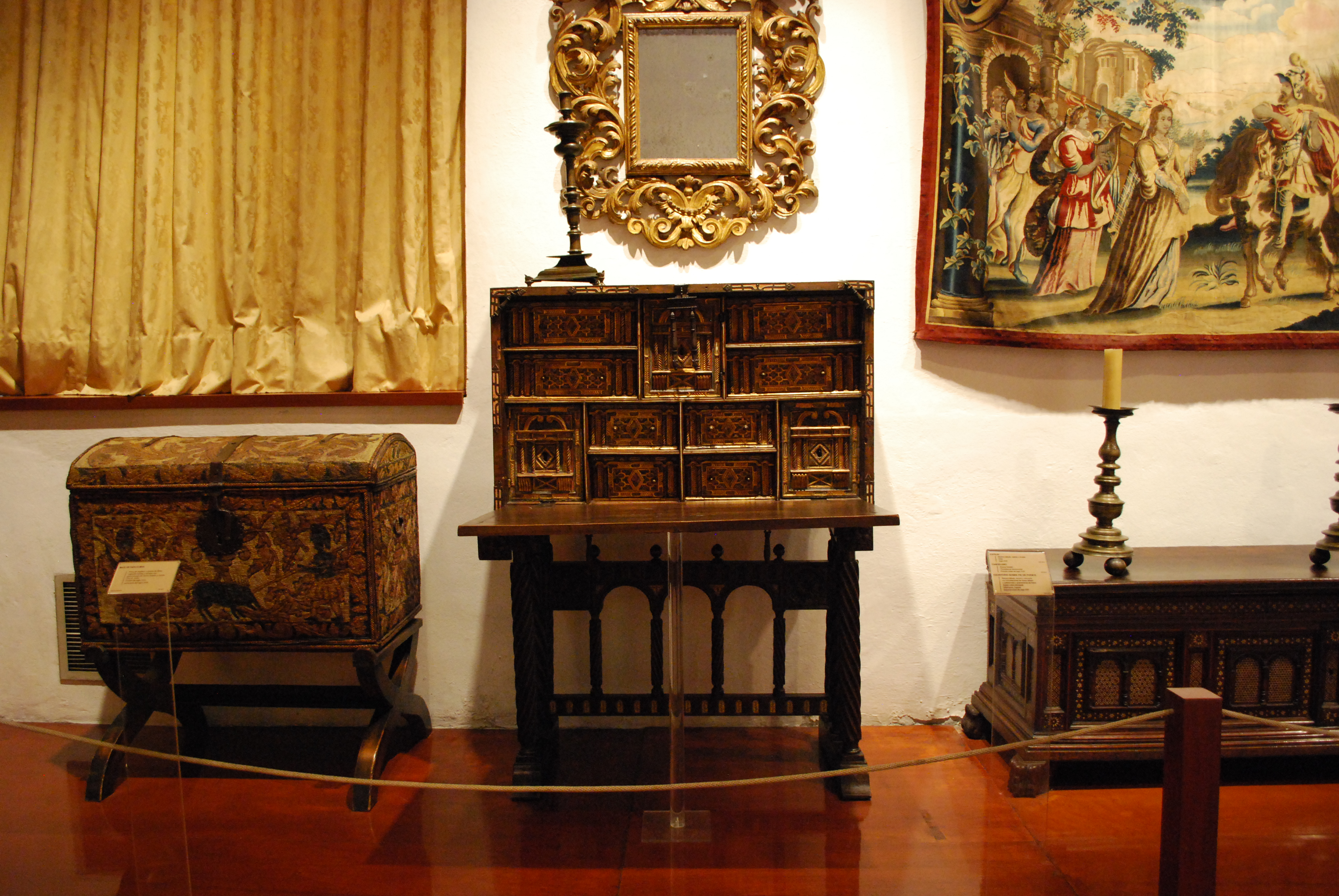

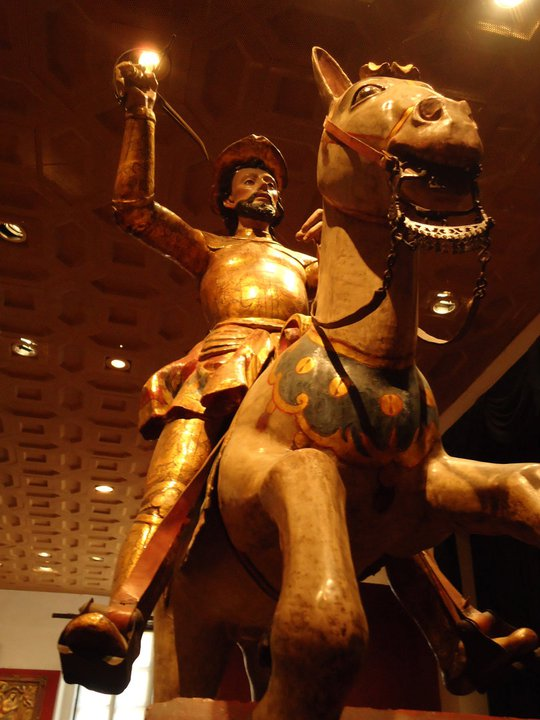

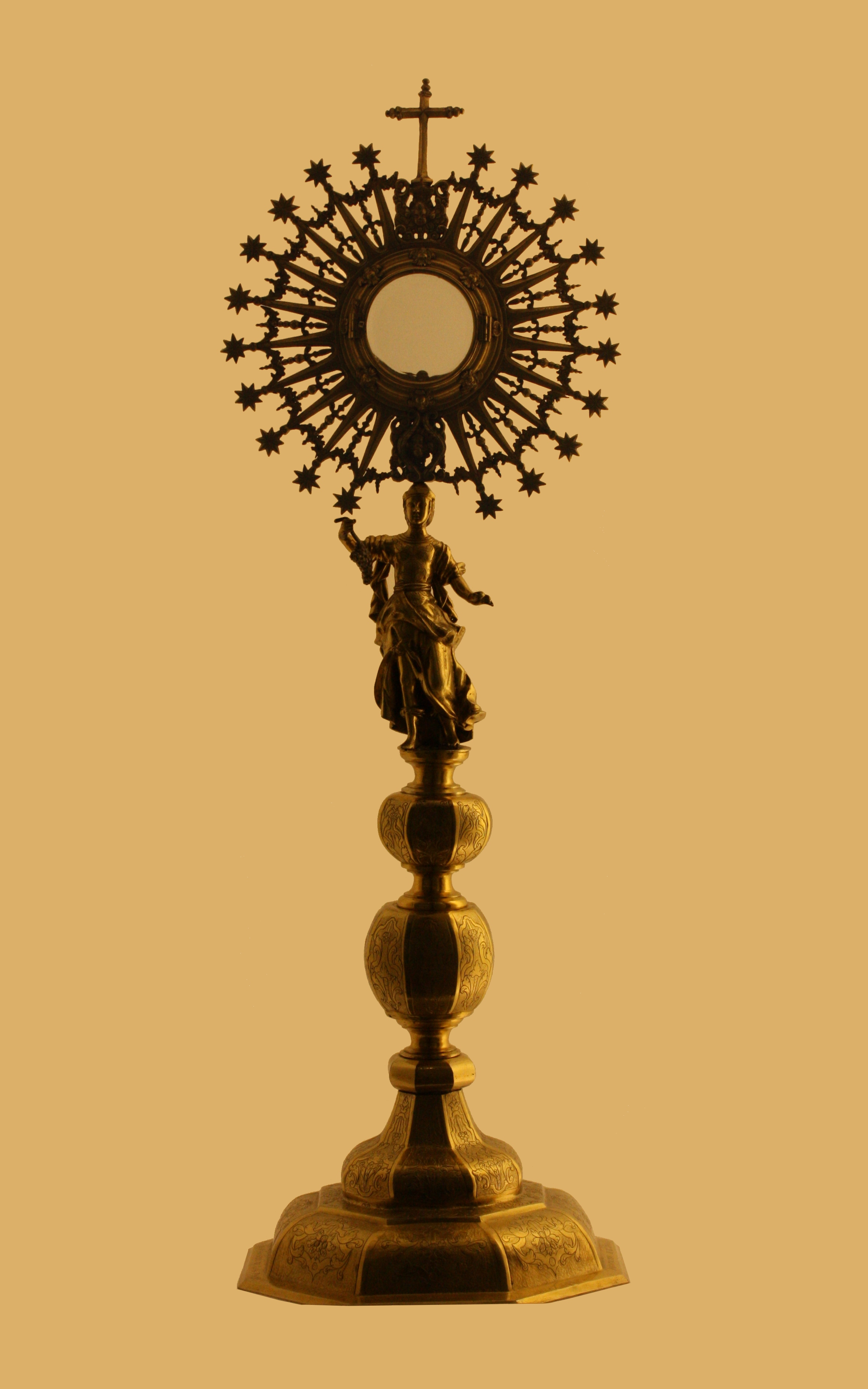

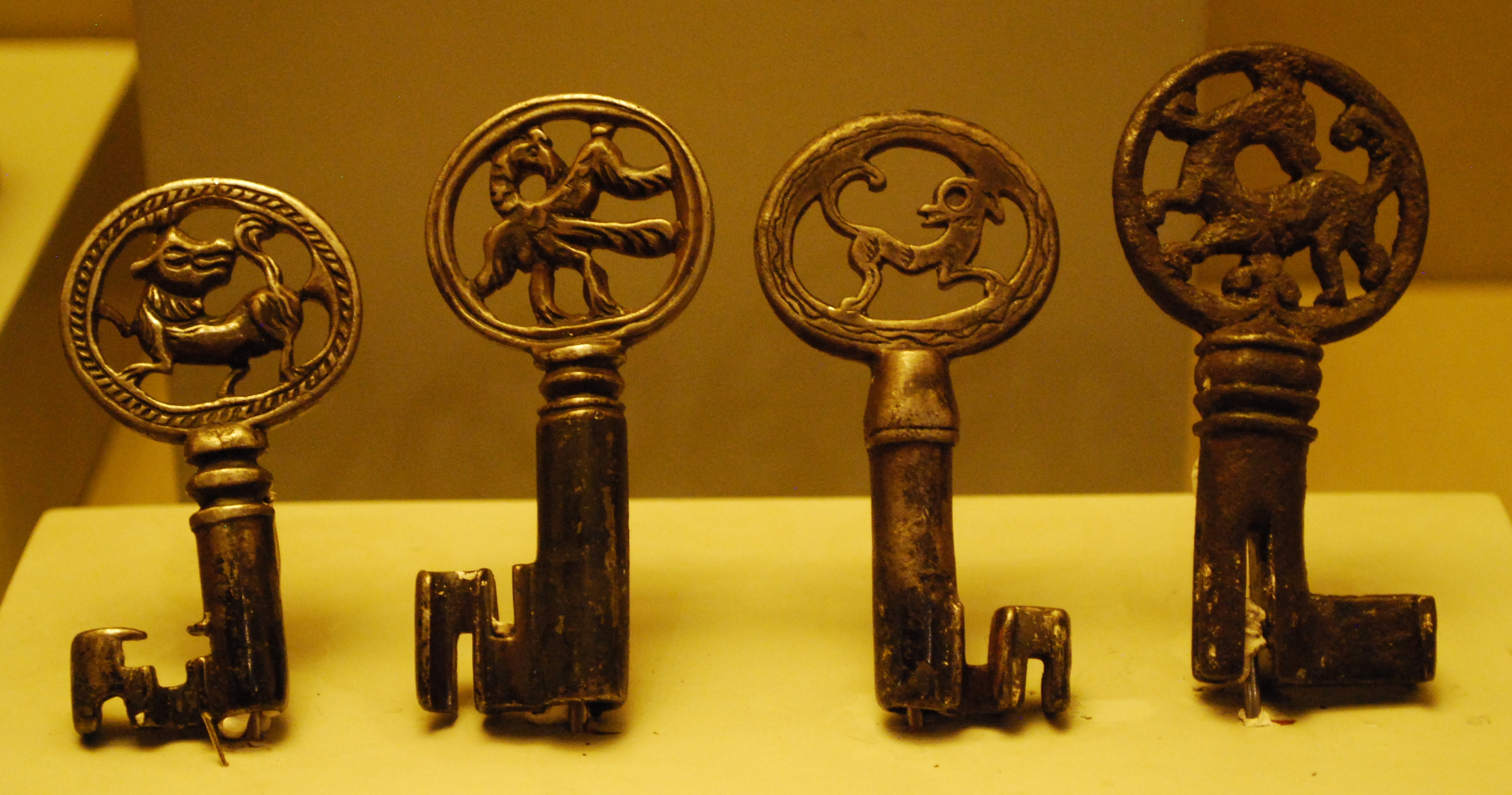

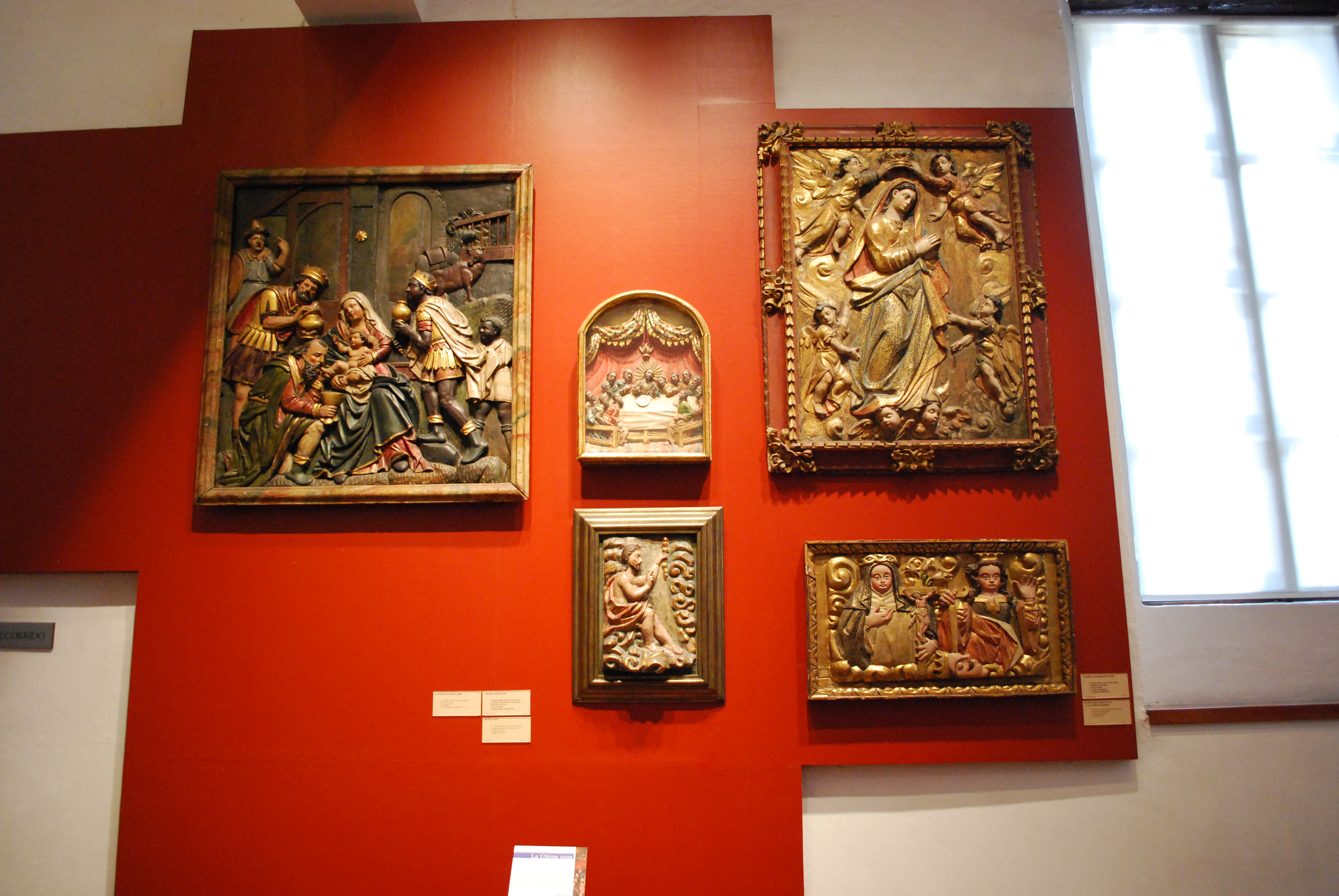

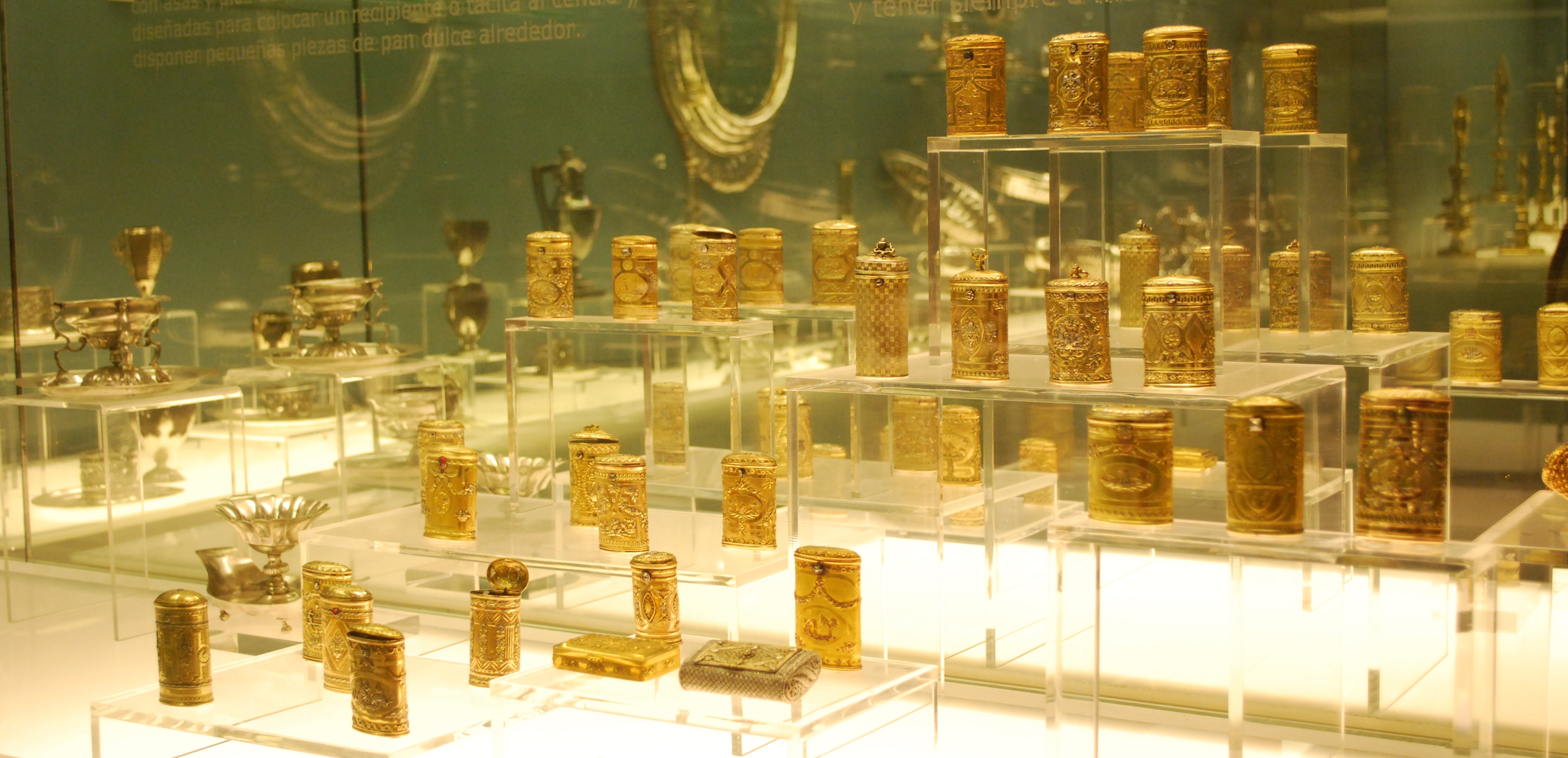

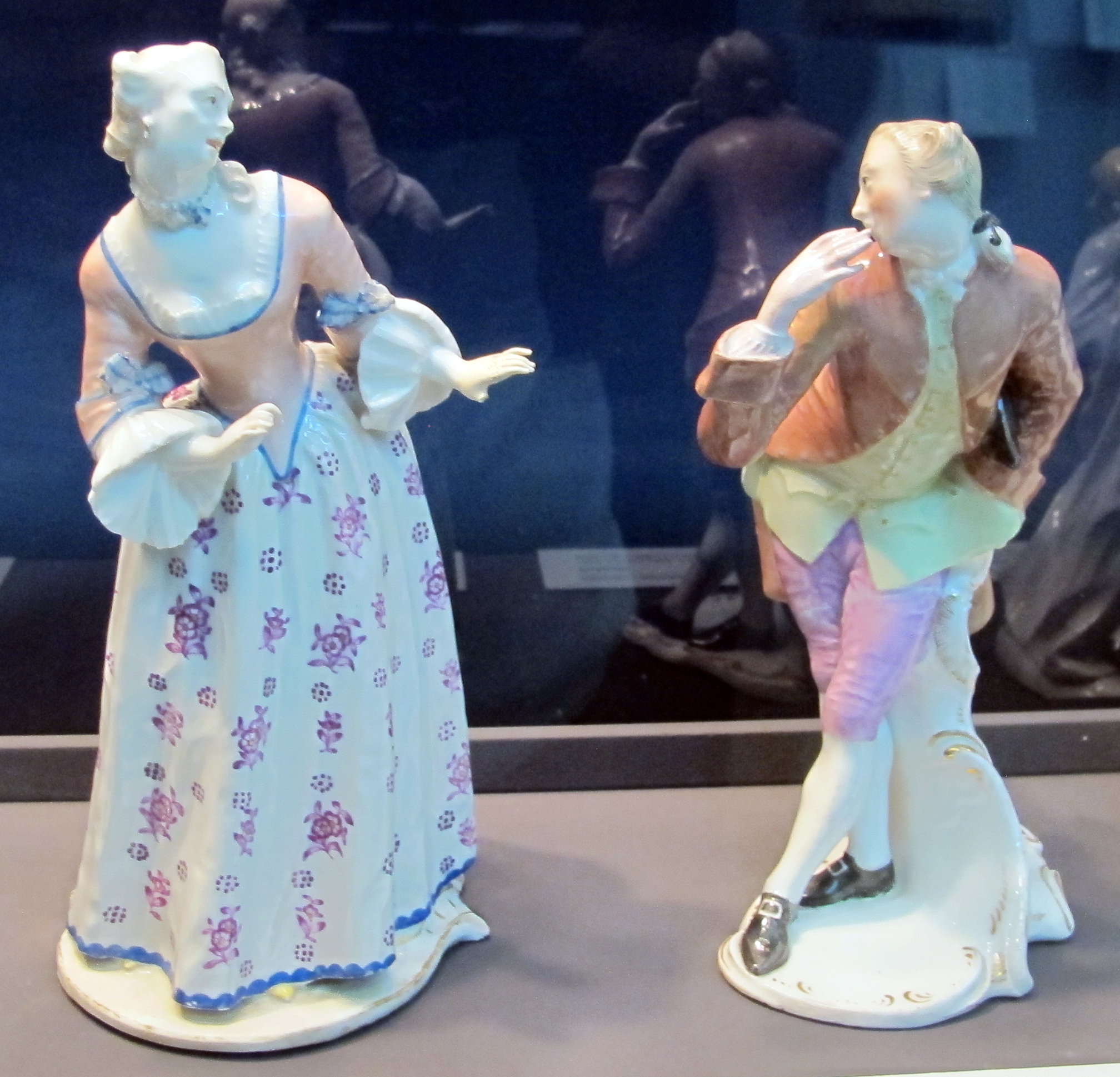

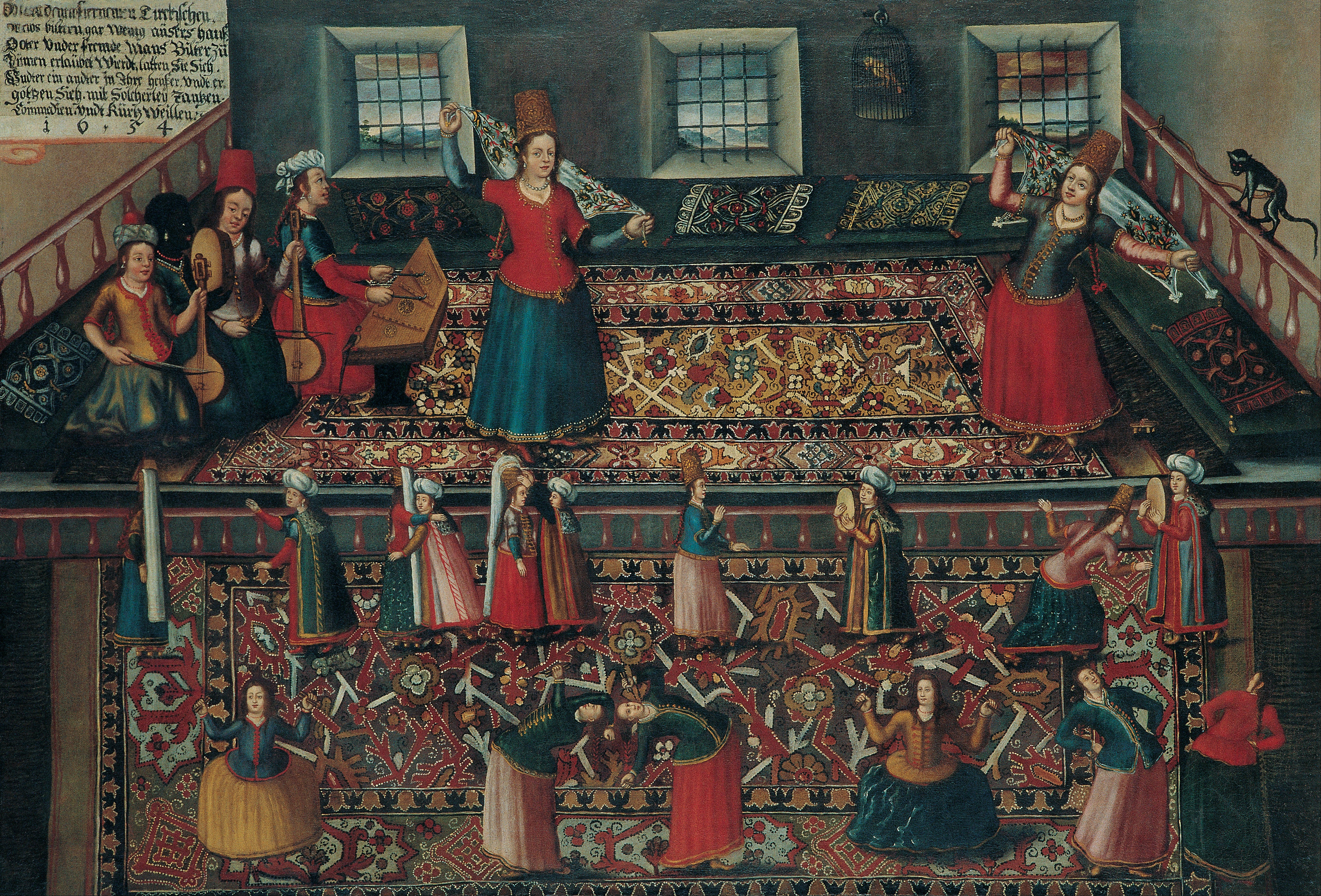

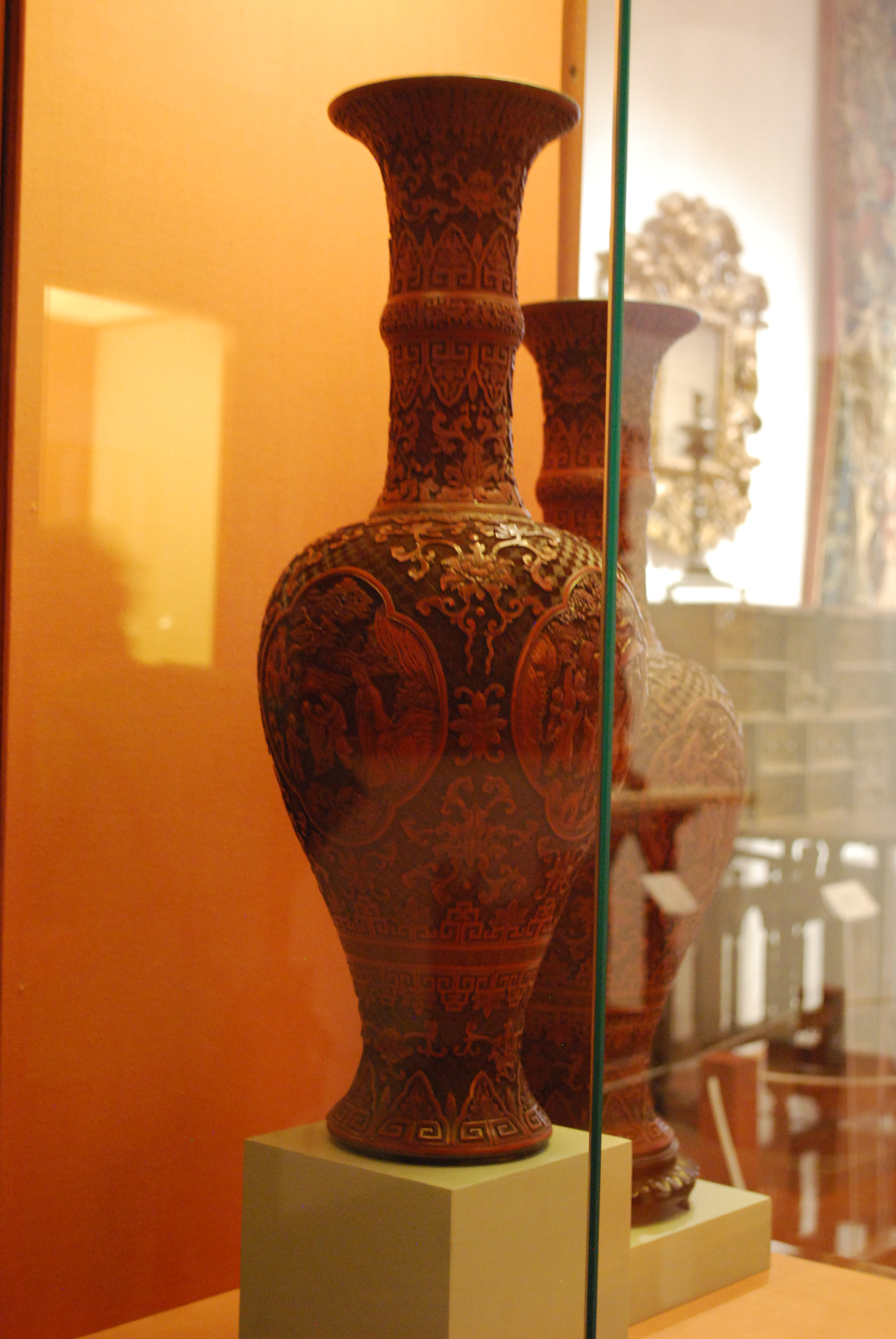

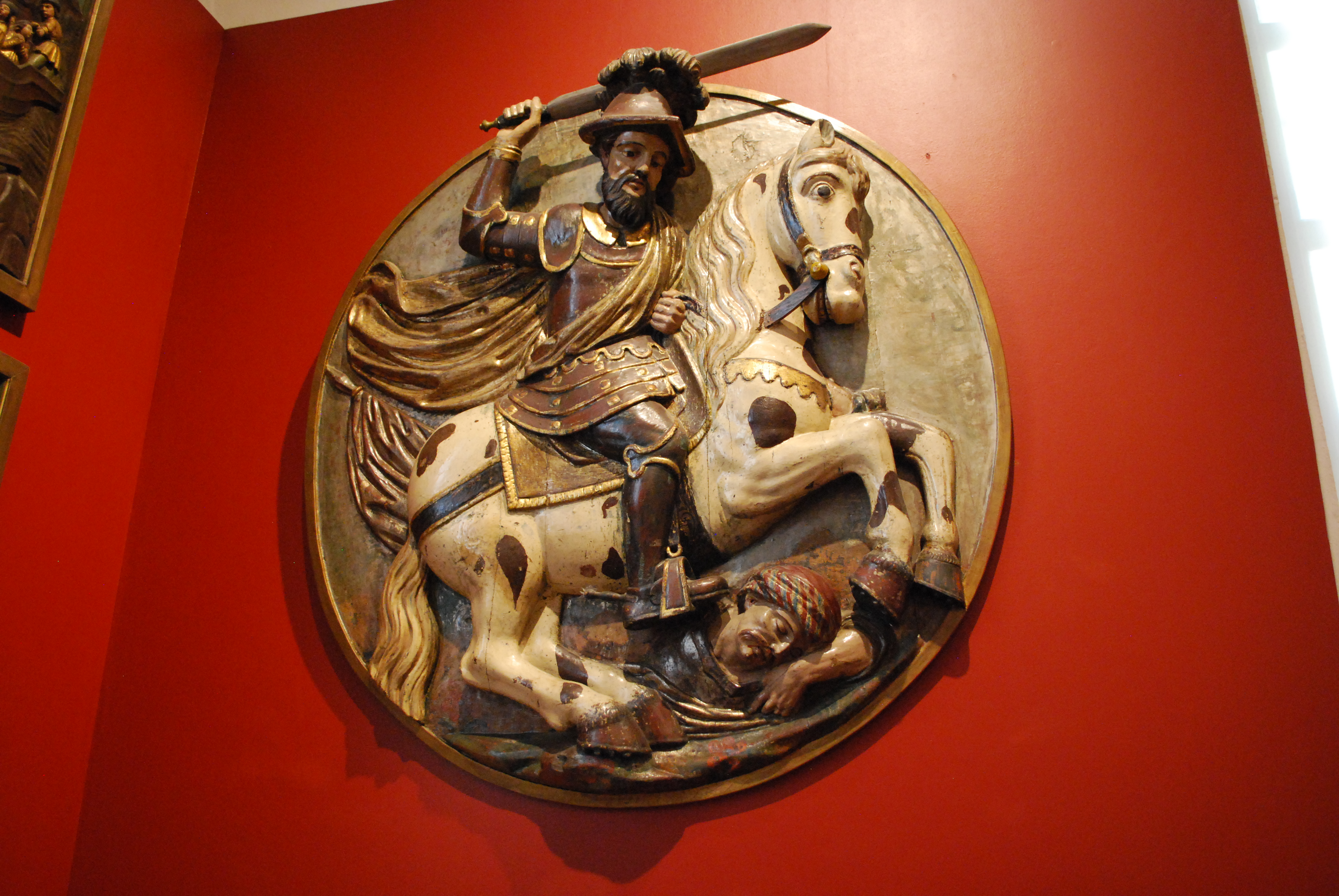

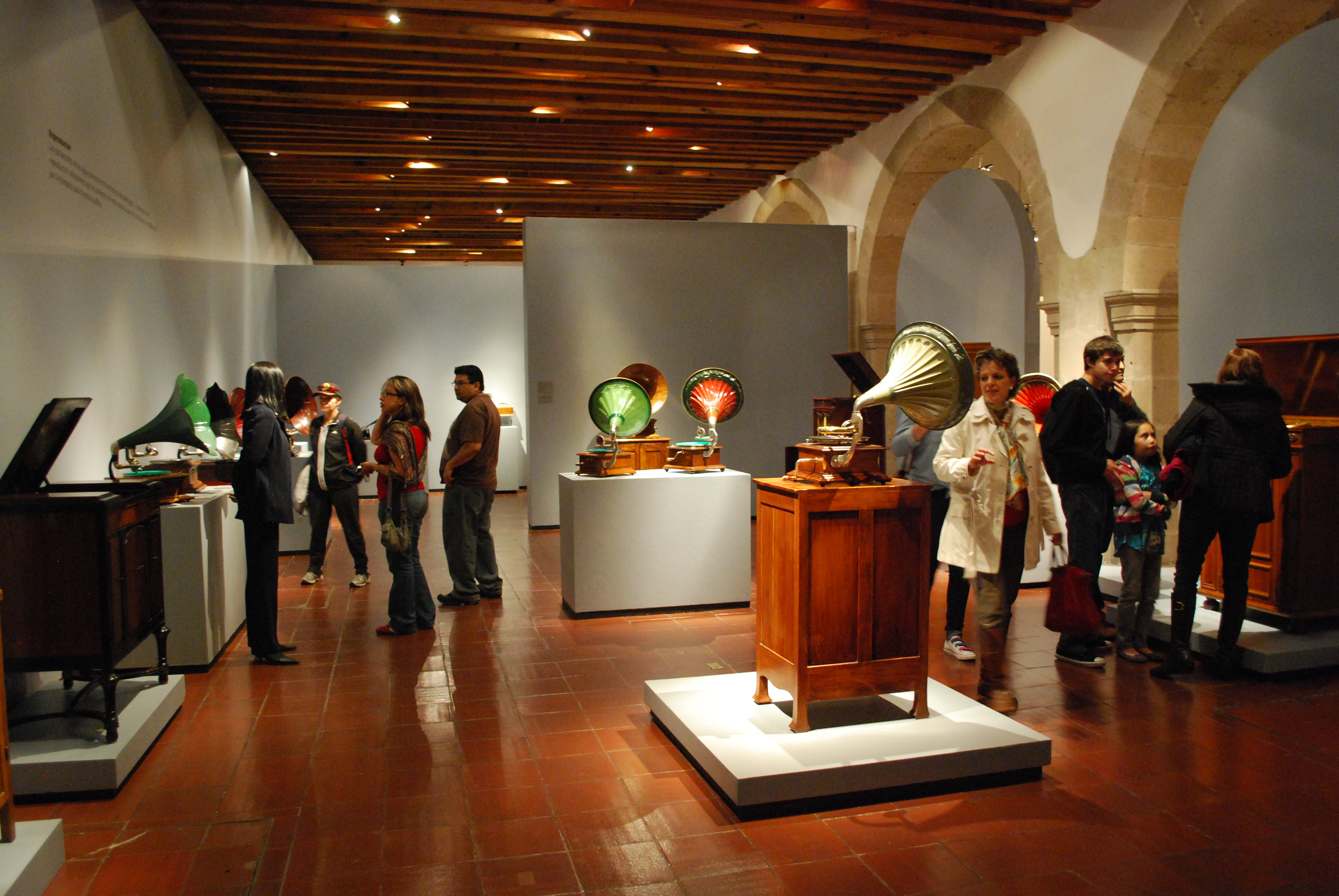

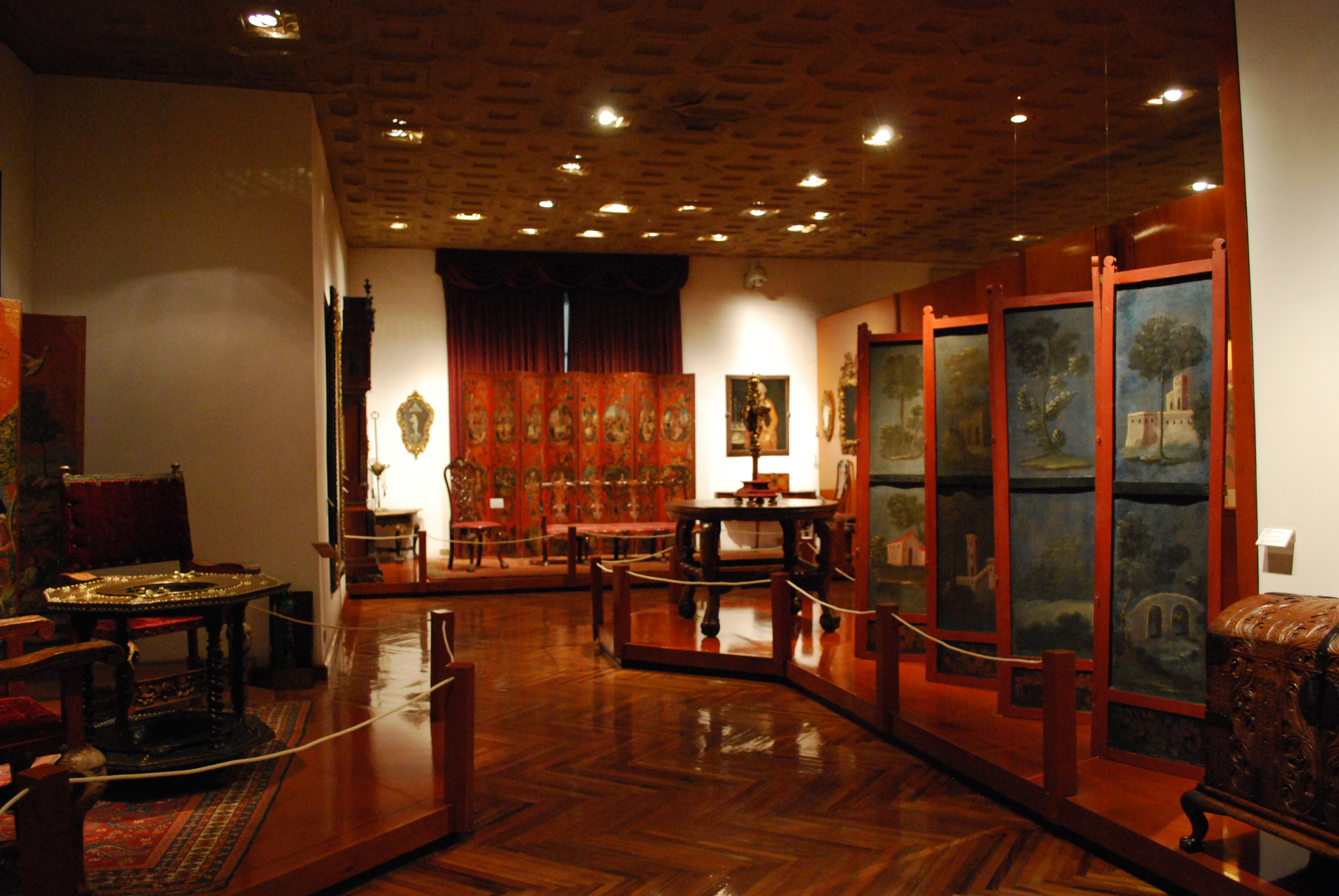

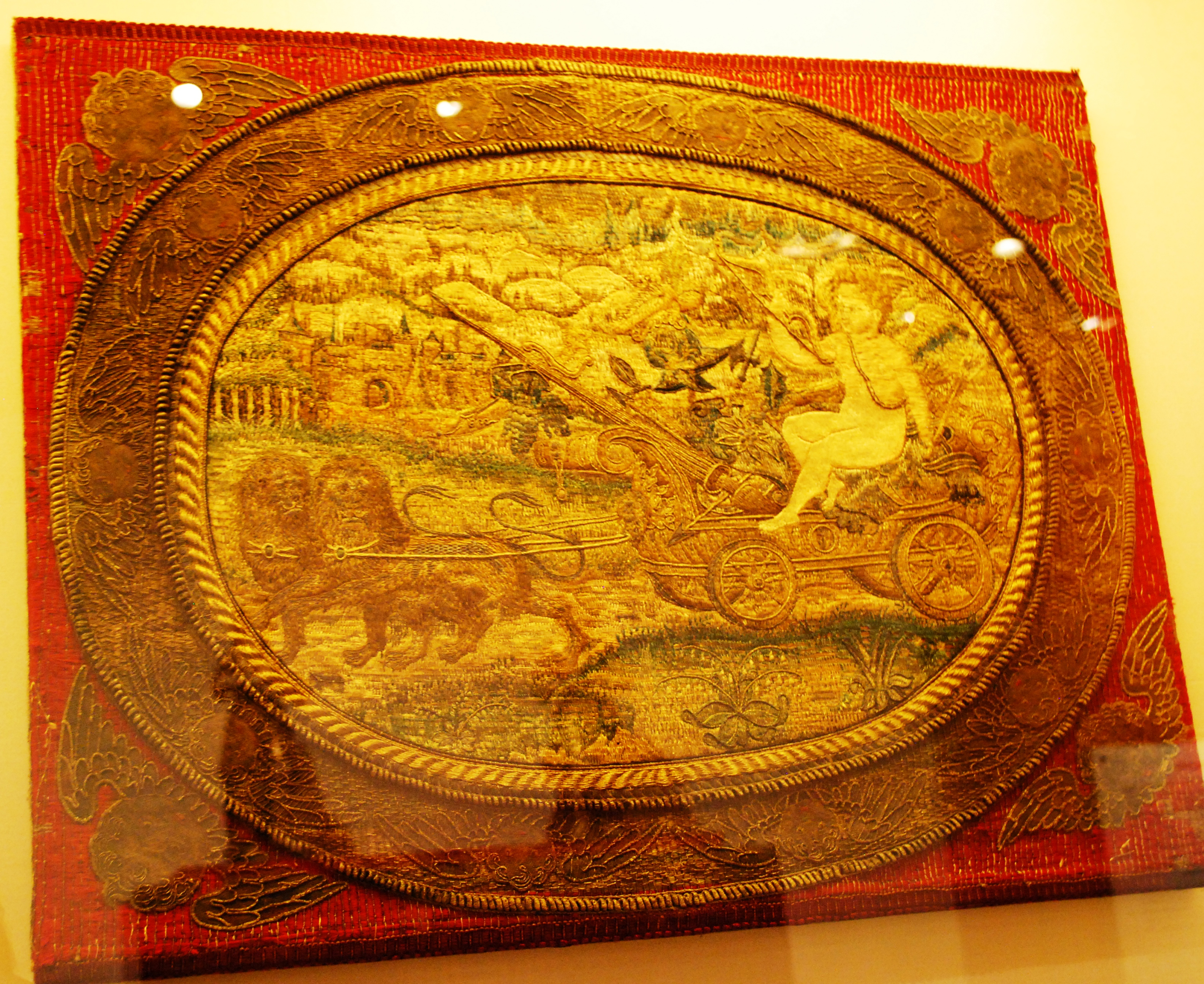

== See also ==
- Casa de Madera Museum, Tenango del Aire
- Museo Objeto del Objeto
