= Franz Mayer =

German-Mexican financier, photographer and collector

Franz Mayer Traumann, better known as Franz Mayer, (1882–1975) was a German-Mexican financier, photographer and collector, and the founder of the Franz Mayer Museum in Mexico City.

== Biography ==
=== Early years ===
Franz Mayer was born in Mannheim, Germany, in 1882, the second son of Simon Meyer Traumann and Clementine Altschul. He attended Carlos Idriss Gymnasium. At age 15, he was hired by Marsans Goldsmith (a banking firm) where he worked for three-and-a-half years. He enlisted as a volunteer in the 2nd Grenadier regiment of Baden Emperor Wilhelm #110 and served there for one year. In 1901 Mayer moved to London, to work for the Seligman and Inberg finance firm. He then moved to the United States to work at the Merrill Lynch brokerage in New York City from 1903 to 1905.

=== Mexico ===
Franz Mayer arrived in Mexico via the port of Veracruz on the Prinz Joachim in 1905. He moved into the financial world at the age of 23 and by around 1908 he had already enrolled as an agent of an independent stock exchange, thus beginning a promising career.

At the outbreak of the Mexican Revolution, he left the country and went to the United States, where he lived for two years before returning to Mexico in 1913. In 1920, he married Maria Antonieta de la Macorra but became a widower a few years later, with no issue. He became a Mexican citizen on 29 December 1933.

From the 1950s, Mayer had conceived the idea of donating his collection of fine and decorative arts to Mexico. Finally in 1963 he set up a trust fund, and the Bank of Mexico was chosen as the fiduciary for the establishment of an art museum in Mexico City. At the same time a sponsor was found among the people closest to him. According to Mayer's wishes, the contract established that the trusteeship would create a library, organize exhibitions, competitions and conferences.

Mayer died in 1975 and donated his collection to the state and people of Mexico. The museum carrying his name was opened in 1986 in a former flour-weighing building and hospital specially renovated in order to house this collection.
