= Artisanal Talavera of Puebla and Tlaxcala =

Type of Mexican majolica pottery

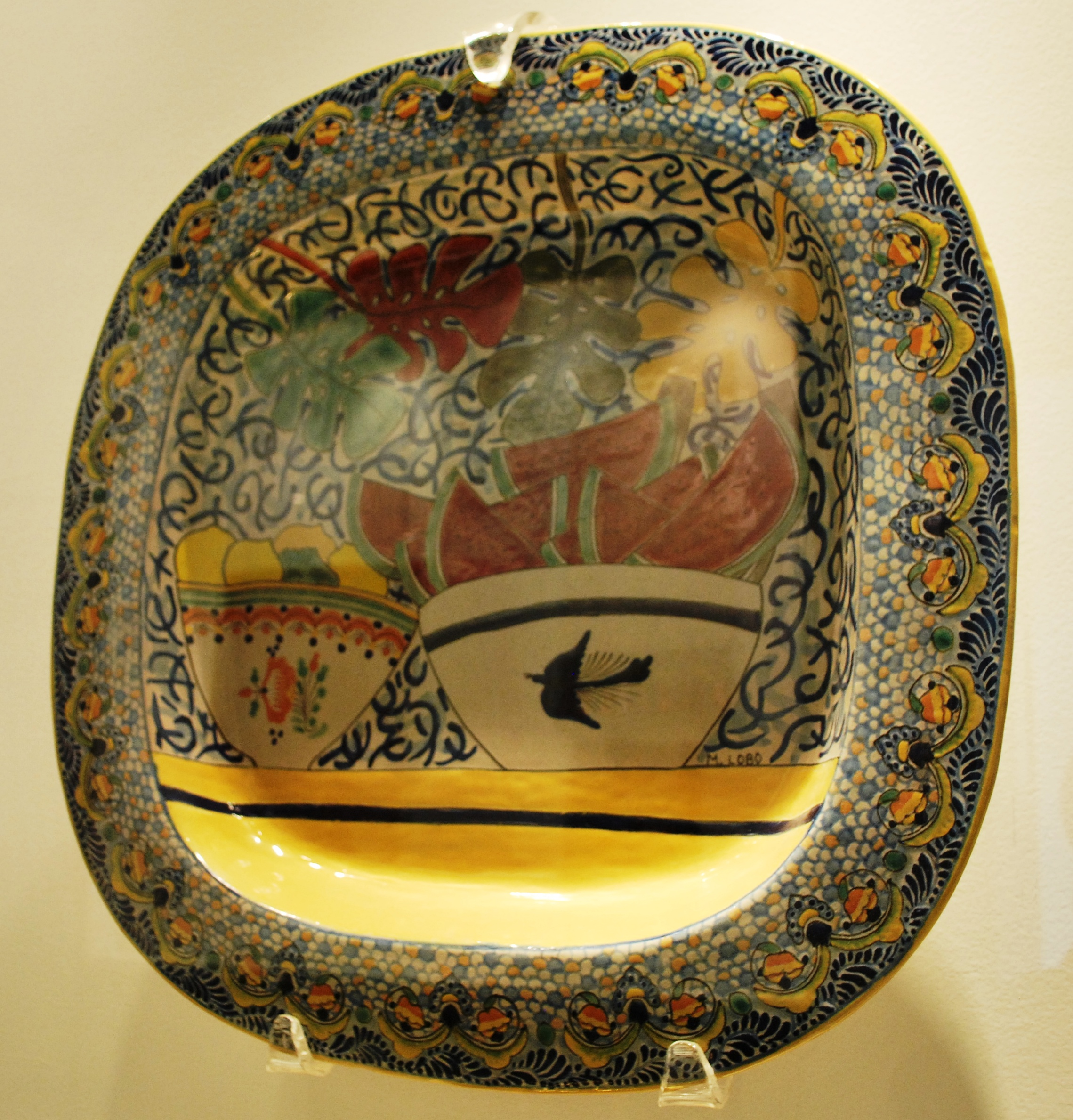
Talavera serving dish by Marcela Lobo on display at the Museo de Arte Popular, Mexico City.

Artisanal Talavera of Puebla and Tlaxcala is a Mexican pottery tradition with heritage from the Talavera de la Reina pottery of Spain. In 2019, both traditions were included in UNESCO's Representative List of the Intangible Cultural Heritage of Humanity.

The Mexican pottery is a type of majolica (faience) or tin-glazed earthenware, with a white base glaze typical of the type. It is made in the town of San Pablo del Monte in the state of Tlaxcala and the cities of Puebla, Atlixco, Cholula, and Tecali in the state of Puebla. Pottery is made in these locations because of the quality of the natural clay found there and the tradition of production which goes back to the 16th century. Much of this pottery was decorated only in blue, but colors such as yellow, black, green, orange and mauve have also been used. Majolica pottery was brought to Mexico by the Spanish in the first century of the colonial period. Production of this ceramic became highly developed in Puebla because of the availability of fine clays and the demand for tiles from the newly established churches and monasteries in the area. The industry had grown sufficiently that by the mid-17th century, standards and guilds had been established which further improved the quality, leading Puebla into what is called the "golden age" of Talavera pottery (from 1650 to 1750). Formally, the tradition that developed there is called Talavera Poblana to distinguish it from the similarly named Talavera pottery of Spain. It is a mixture of Italian, Spanish and indigenous ceramic techniques.

The tradition has struggled since the Mexican War of Independence in the early 19th century, when the number of workshops was reduced to fewer than eight in the state of Puebla. Later efforts by artists and collectors revived the craft somewhat in the early 20th century and there are now significant collections of Talavera pottery in Puebla, Mexico City and New York City. Further efforts to preserve and promote the craft have occurred in the late 20th century, with the introduction of new, decorative designs and the passage of the Denominación de Origen de la Talavera law to protect authentic, Talavera pieces made with the original, 16th-century methods.

== Definition ==
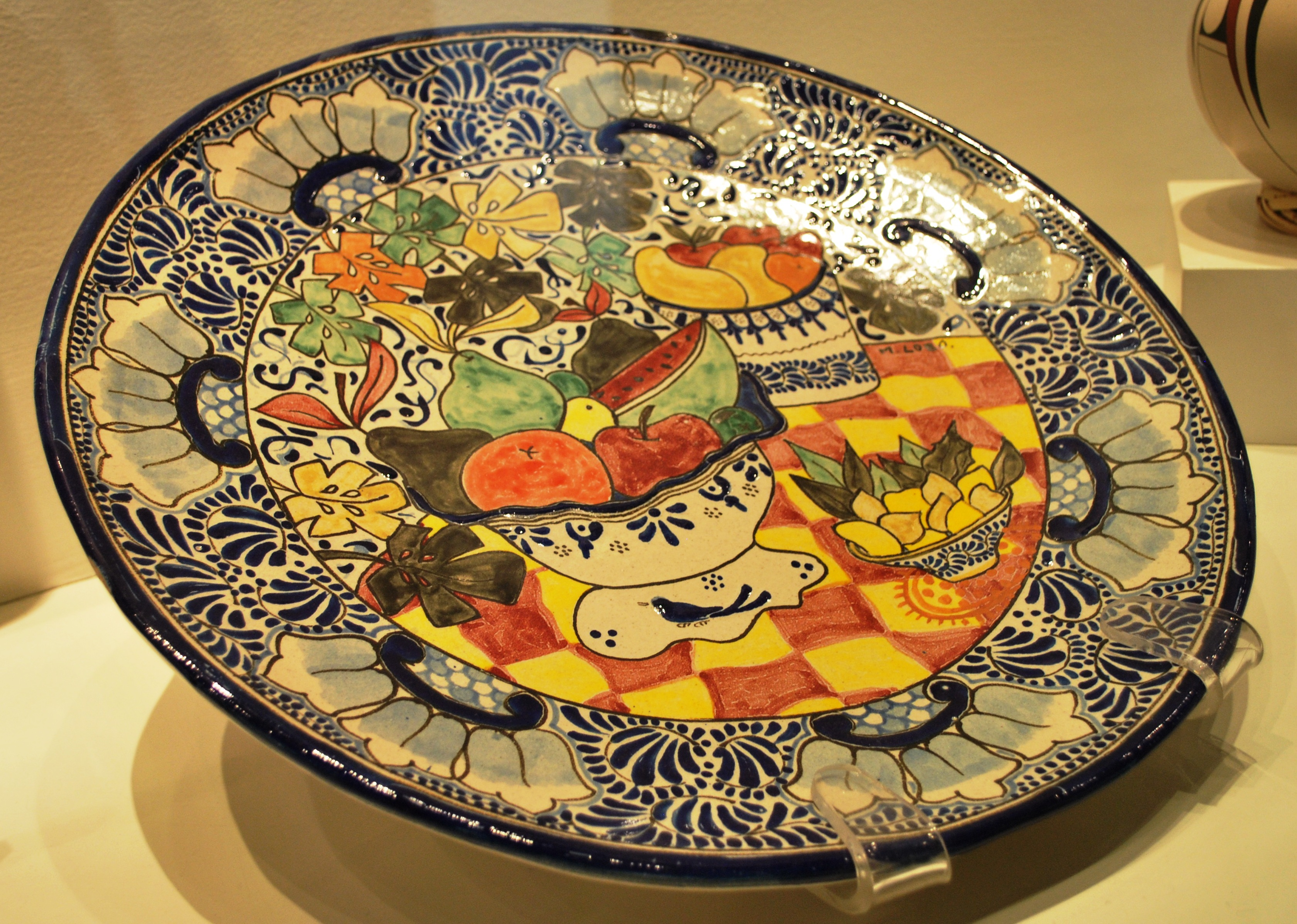
Talavera plate by Marcela Lobo

Authentic Talavera pottery mainly comes from Talavera de la Reina in Spain, and the town of San Pablo del Monte (in Tlaxcala) and the cities of Puebla, Atlixco, Cholula and Tecali, in Mexico; as the clays needed and the history of this craft are both centered there. All pieces are hand-thrown on a potter's wheel and the glazes contain tin and lead, as they have since colonial times. This glaze must craze, be slightly porous and milky-white, but not pure white. There are only six permitted colors: blue, yellow, black, green, orange and mauve, and these colors must be made from natural pigments. The painted designs have a blurred appearance as they fuse slightly into the glaze. The base, the part that touches the table, is not glazed but exposes the terra cotta underneath. An inscription is required on the bottom that contains the following information: the logo of the manufacturer, the initials of the artist and the location of the manufacturer in Puebla.

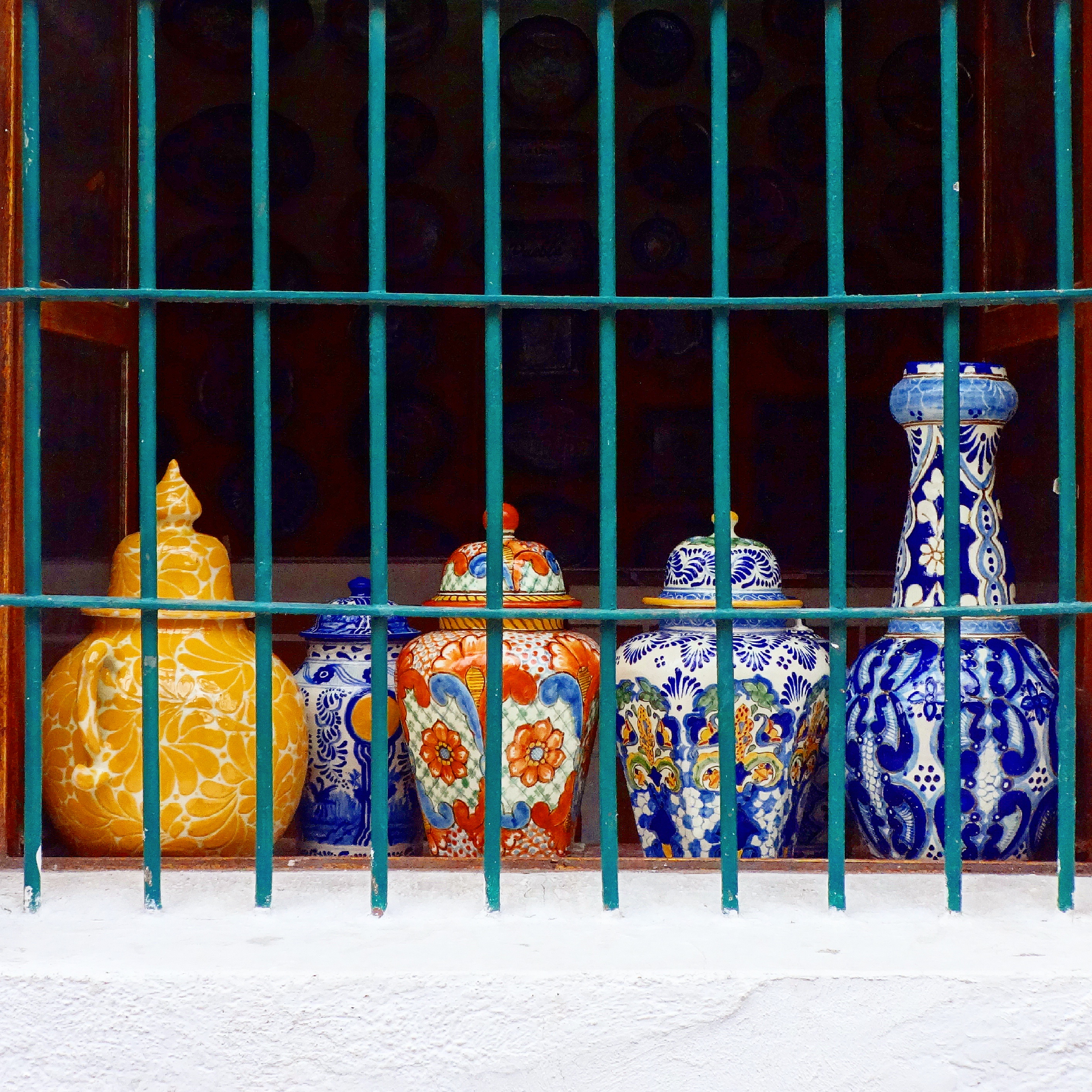
Jars in the window of workshop "Taller Armando".

The design of the pieces is highly regulated by tradition. The paint ends up slightly raised over the base. In the early days, only a cobalt blue was used, as this was the most expensive pigment, making it highly sought after not only for prestige but also because it ensured the quality of the entire piece. Only natural clays are used, rather than chemically treated and dyed clays and the handcrafting process takes three to four months. The process is risky because a piece can break at any point. This makes Talavera three times more costly than other types of pottery. Because of this, Talavera manufacturers have been under pressure from imitations, commonly from China, and similar ceramics from other parts of Mexico, especially Guanajuato. Guanajuato state petitioned the federal government for the right to share the Talavera designation with Puebla, but, since 1997, this has been denied and glazed ceramics from other parts of Mexico are called Maiolica or Majolica.

Today, only pieces made by designated areas and from workshops that have been certified are permitted to call their work "Talavera." Certification is issued by the Consejo Regulador de la Talavera, a special regulatory body. Only nine workshops have so far been certified: Uriarte Talavera, Talavera La Reyna, Talavera Armando, Talavera Celia, Talavera Santa Catarina, Talavera de la Nueva España, Talavera de la Luz, Talavera de las Americas, and Talavera Virglio Perez. Each of these needs to pass a twice-yearly inspection of the manufacturing processes. Pieces are subject to sixteen laboratory tests with internationally certified labs. In addition, there is a test done by the Faculty of Sciences of the University of Puebla to ensure that the glaze does not have lead content of more than 2.5 parts per million or cadmium content of more than 0.25 parts per million, as many of the pieces are used to serve food. Only pieces from workshops that meet the standards are authorized to have the signature of the potter, the logo of the workshop and the special hologram that certifies the piece's authenticity.

== Production ==
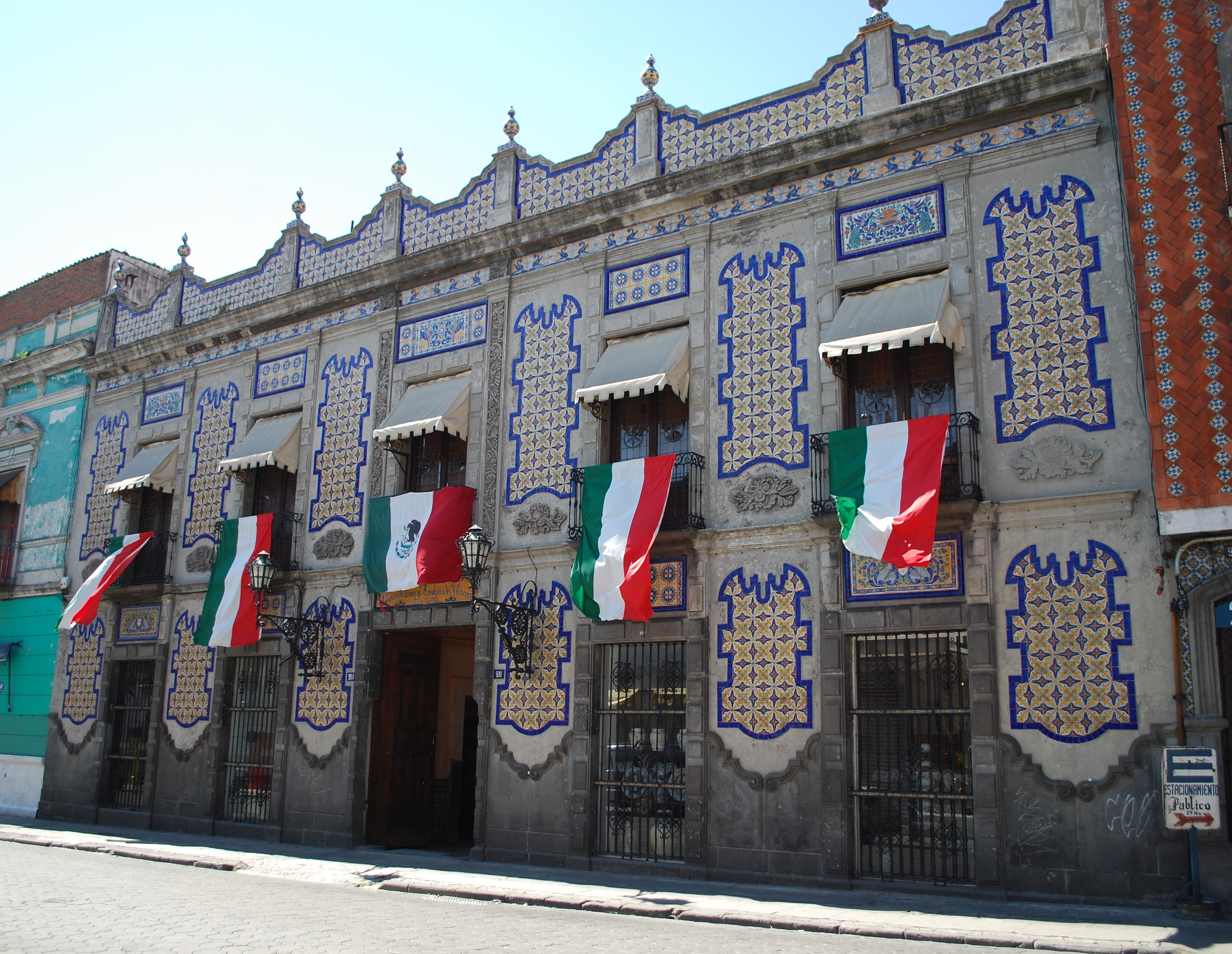
Uriarte Talavera workshop in Puebla

The process to create Talavera pottery is elaborate and it has basically not changed since the early colonial period when the craft was first introduced. The first step is to mix black sand from Amozoc and white sand from Tecali. It is then washed and filtered to keep only the finest particles. This can reduce the volume by fifty percent. Next the piece is shaped by hand on a potter's wheel, then left to dry for a number of days. Then comes the first firing, done at 850 °C (1,560 °F). The piece is tested to see if there are any cracks in it. The initial glazing, which creates the milky-white background, is applied. After this, the design is hand painted. Finally, a second firing is applied to harden the glaze. This process takes about three months for most pieces, but some pieces can take up to six months.

This process is so complicated and plagued with the possibility of irreparable damage that during colonial times, artisans prayed special prayers, especially during the firing process.

Some workshops in Puebla offer guided tours and explain the processes involved. The oldest certified, continuously operating workshop is in Uriarte. It was founded in 1824 by Dimas Uriarte, and specialized in traditional colonial-era designs. Another certified workshop, Talavera de la Reina, is known for revitalizing the decoration of the ceramics with the work of 1990s Mexican artists.

== Usage ==
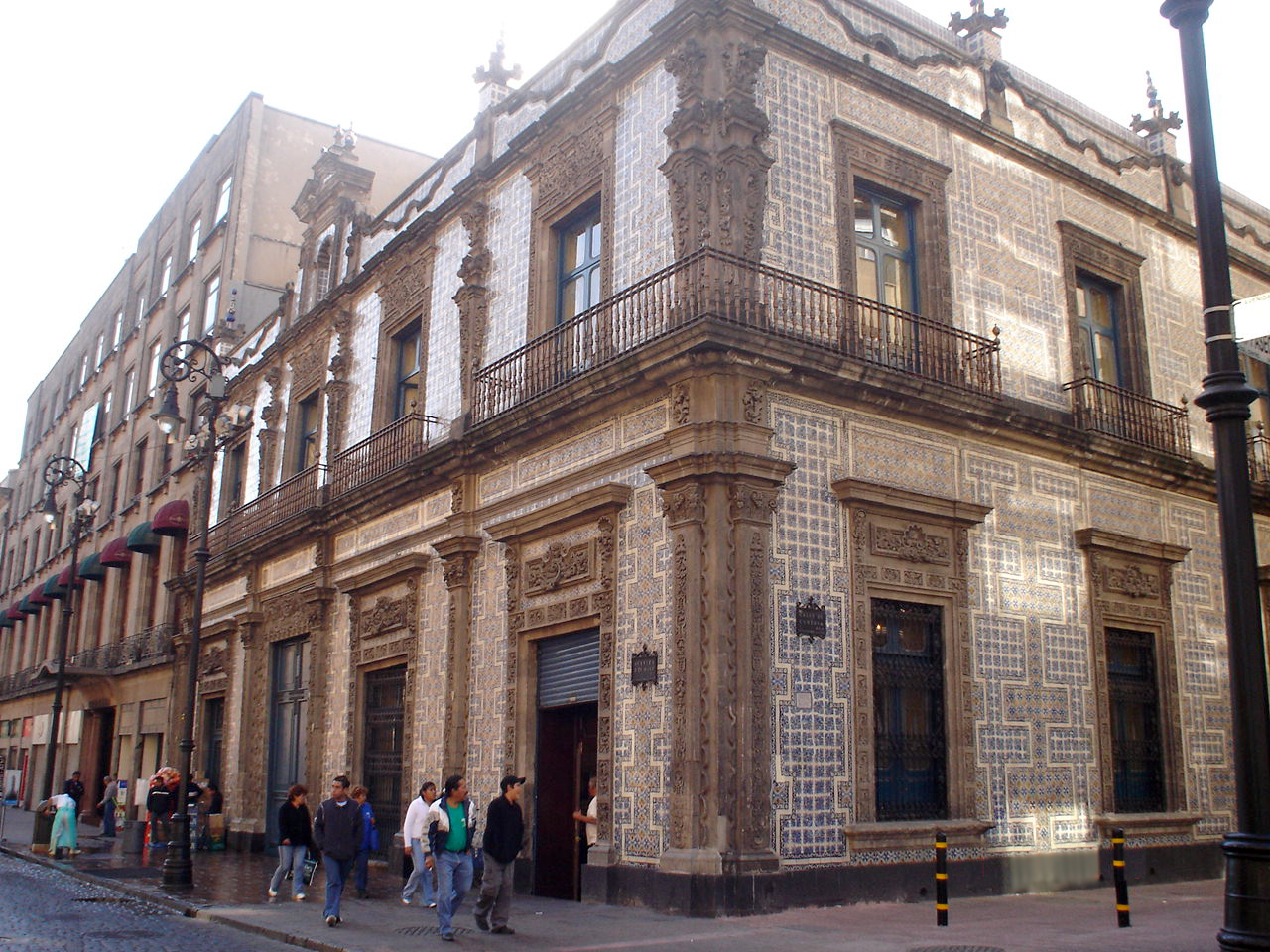
The Casa de los Azulejos in Mexico City

Talavera ceramic is mostly used to make utilitarian items such as plates, bowls, jars, flowerpots, sinks, religious items and decorative figures. However, a significant use of the ceramic is for tiles, which are used to decorate both the inside and outside of buildings in Mexico, especially in the city of Puebla. The Puebla kitchen is one of the traditional environments of Talavera pottery, from the tiles that decorate the walls and counters to the dishes and other food containers. It is a very distinct style of kitchen. In monastery kitchens of the area, many of the designs also incorporate the emblem of the religious order. Many of the façades in the historic center of Puebla are decorated with these tiles. These tiles are called azulejos and can be found on fountains, patios, the façades of homes, churches and other buildings, forming an important part of Puebla's Baroque architecture. This use of azulejos attested to the family's or church's wealth. This led to a saying "to never be able to build a house with tiles", which meant to not amount to anything in life. Being able to show this kind of wealth was not restricted to Puebla. In Mexico City, the church of the Convent of La Encarnacion and the church of the Virgin of Valvanera both feature cupolas covered in Talavera. The most famous example of Talavera in the capital city is the Casa de los Azulejos, or House of Tiles, which is an 18th-century palace built by the Count del Valle de Orizaba family. What makes this palace, in the City of Palaces, distinct is that its façade on three sides is completely covered in expensive, blue-and-white tile – sensational at the time the tiles were applied.

== History ==
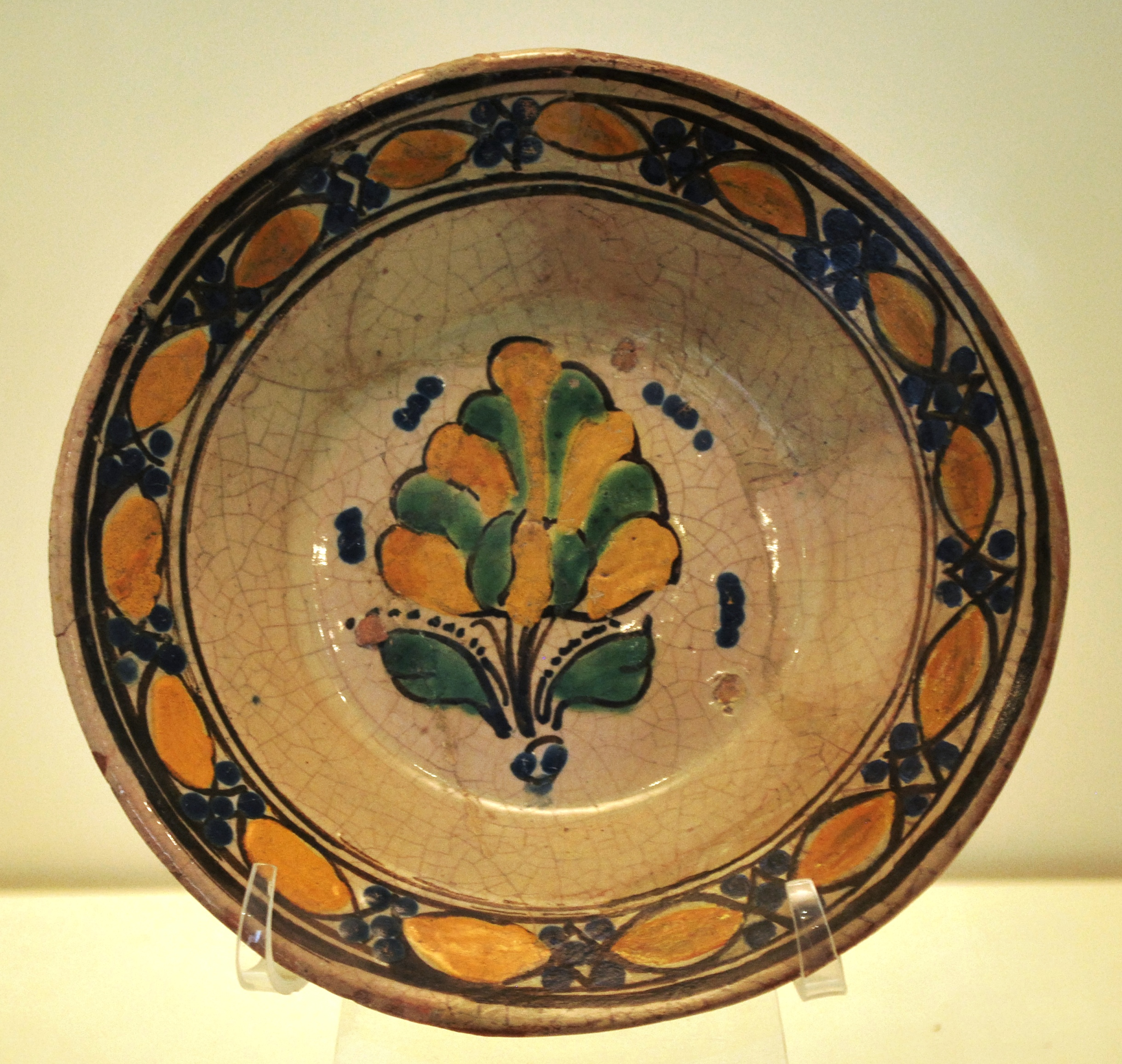
Talavera bowl from the 16th or 17th century

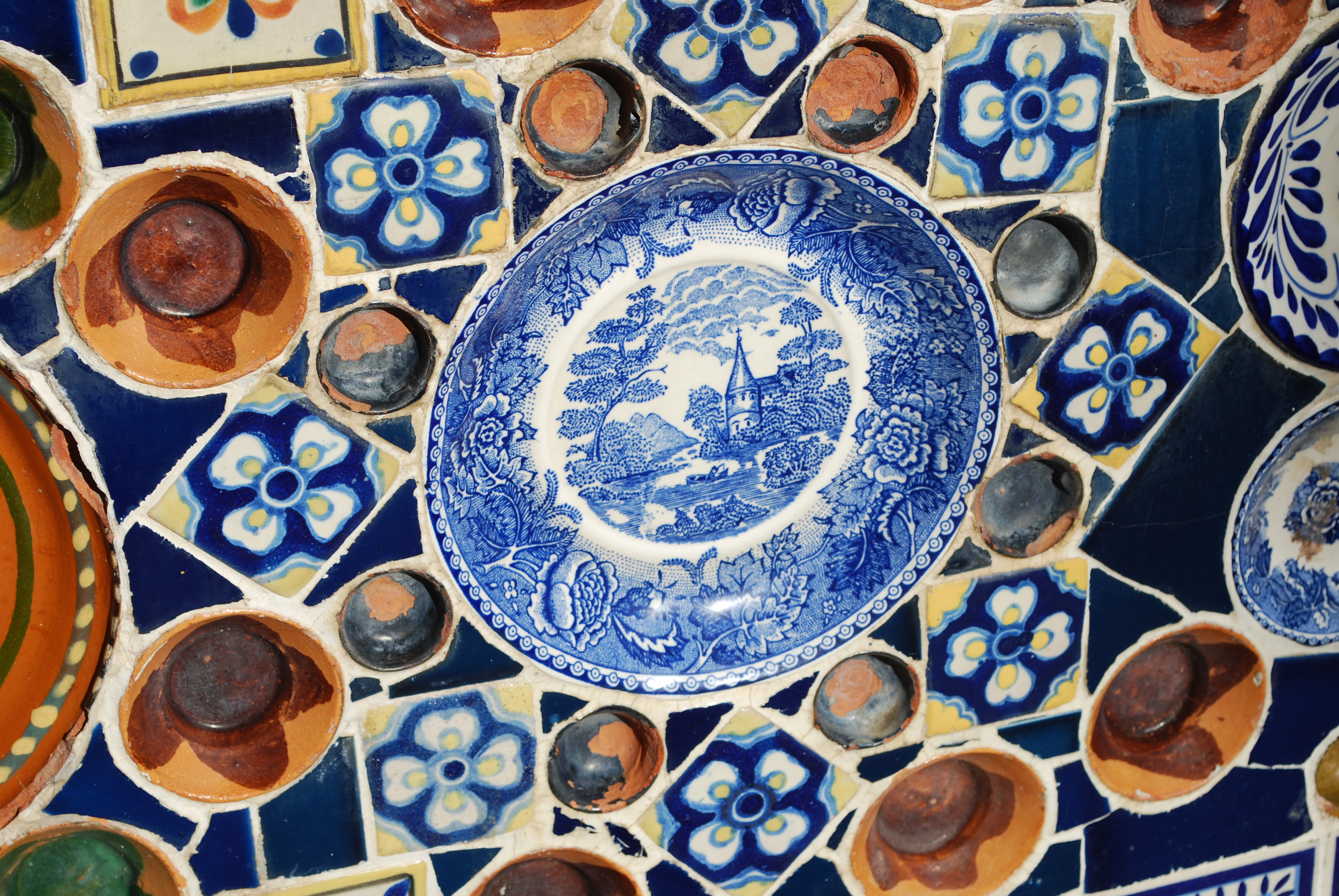
Detail of the Talavera mosaic used to decorate a fountain at the Chautla Hacienda in San Salvador el Verde, Puebla.

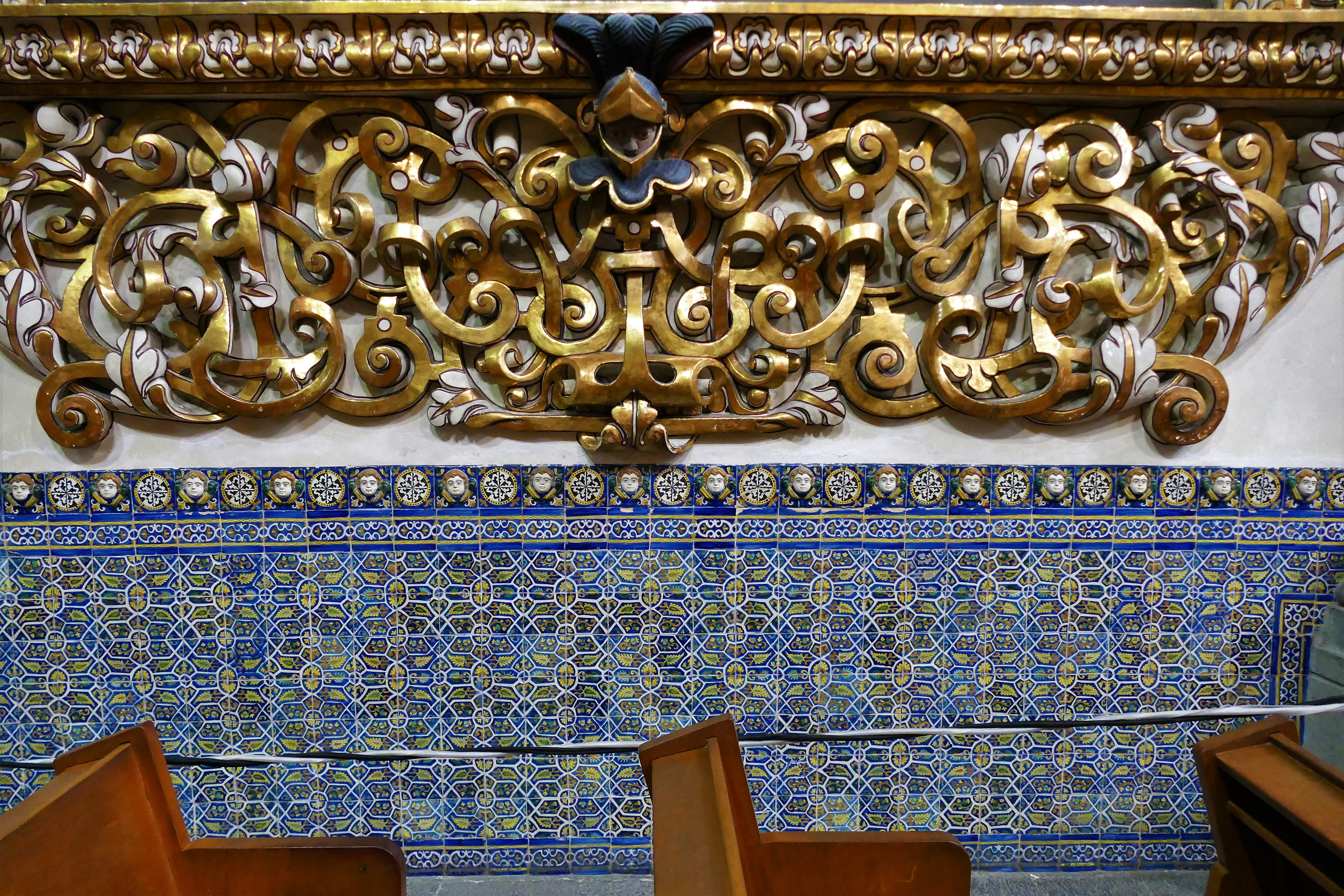
17th century Talavera azulejos inside the Chapel of the Rosario, Puebla

Techniques and designs of Islamic pottery were brought to Spain by the Moors by the end of the 12th century as Hispano-Moresque ware. From there they influenced late medieval pottery in the rest of Spain and Europe, under the name majolica. Spanish craftsmen from Talavera de la Reina (Castile, Spain) adopted and added to the art form. Further Italian influences were incorporated as the craft evolved in Spain, and guilds were formed to regulate the quality.

During roughly the same time period, pre-Hispanic cultures had their own tradition of pottery and ceramics, but they did not involve a potter's wheel or glazing. There are several theories as to how majolica pottery was introduced to Mexico. The most common and accepted theory is that it was introduced by monks who either sent for artisans from Spain or knew how to produce the ceramics themselves. These monks wanted tiles and other objects to decorate their new monasteries, so to keep up with this demand, either Spanish artists or the monks taught indigenous artists to produce the glazed pottery. A significant number of secular potters came to Mexico from Seville and Talavera de la Reina, Spain during the very early colonial period. Later a notable potter by the name of Diego Gaytán, who was a native of Talavera, made an impact on pottery after he arrived in Puebla.

From the time that the city of Puebla was founded in 1531, a large number of churches and monasteries were being built. The demand for tiles to decorate these buildings plus the availability of high-quality clay in the area gave rise to the ceramic industry. It was soon produced by indigenous people as well as Spanish craftsmen, which resulted in a mixture of influences, especially in decorative design. The new tradition came to be known as Talavera Poblana to distinguish it from that of Talavera pottery from Spain. By 1550, the city of Puebla was producing high-quality Talavera wares and, by 1580, it had become the center of Talavera production in Mexico.

From 1580 to the mid-17th century, the number of potters and workshops kept growing, each having their own designs and techniques. The colonial government decided to regulate the industry with guilds and standards. In 1653, the first ordinances were passed. These regulated who could be called a craftsman, the categories of product quality, and norms of decoration. The effect was to standardize the production of ceramics and increase the quality of what was produced. Some of the rules established by the ordinances included the use of blue cobalt on only the finest, quality pieces, the marking of pieces by craftsmen to avoid counterfeits, the creation of categories of quality (fine, semi-fine and daily use), and yearly inspections and examination of master potters.

The period between 1650 and 1750 was known as the Golden Age of Talavera. Puebla became the most important earthenware center of New Spain. Pieces were shipped all over the territory, and were sent to Guatemala, Cuba, Santo Domingo, Venezuela and Colombia. During this time, the preferred use of blue on Talavera pottery was reinforced by the influence of China's Ming dynasty through imported Chinese ceramics that came to Mexico via the Manila galleons. Italian influences in the 18th century introduced the use of other colors.

During the Mexican War of Independence, the potters' guild and the ordinances of the 17th century were abolished. This allowed anyone to make the ceramic in any way, leading to a decline in quality. The war disrupted trade among the Spanish colonies and cheaper English porcelain was being imported. The Talavera market crashed. Out of the forty-six workshops that were producing in the 18th century, only seven remained after the war.

In 1897, a Catalan by the name of Enrique Luis Ventosa arrived to Puebla. Ventosa was fascinated by the history of the craft which was unique from other art forms in Mexico. He studied the original processes and combined it with his knowledge of contemporary, Spanish work. He published articles and poems about the tradition and worked to decorate ceramic pieces. In 1922, he befriended Ysauro Uriarte Martinez, a young potter, who had inherited his grandfather's workshop. The two men collaborated to create new decorative designs, adding pre-Columbian and Art Nouveau influences to the Islamic, Chinese, Spanish and Italian influences that were already present. They also worked to restore the former levels of quality. Their timing was good as the Mexican Revolution had ended and the country was in a period of reconstruction.

However, by the 1980s, there had been a further decline in the number of workshops until only four remained. Talavera had been under pressure in the latter part of the 20th century because of competition from pottery made in other Mexican states, cheap imports and the lack of more modern and imaginative designs. In the early 1990s, the Talavera de la Reina workshop began revitalizing the craft by inviting artists to work with their artisans to create new pieces and new decorative designs. Among the artists were Juan Soriano, Vicente Rojo Almazán, Javier Marín, Gustavo Pérez, Magali Lara and Francisco Toledo. They did not change the ceramic processes, but added human forms, animals, other items and traditional images of flowers to the designs.

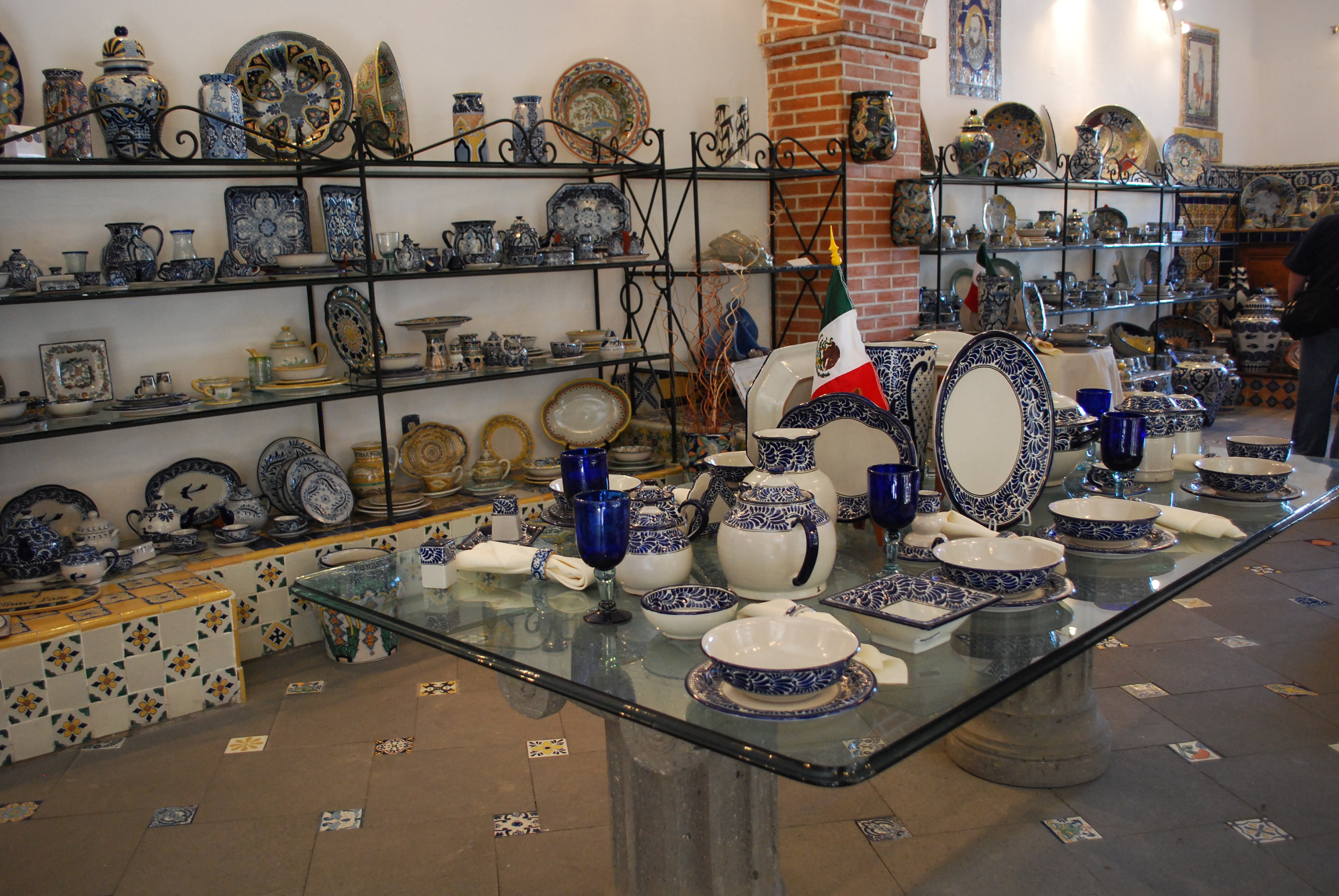
One of the display rooms at the Uriarte workshop

Since then there has been some resurgence in the craft. In the 2000s, seventeen workshops were producing Talavera in the old tradition. Eight were in the process of becoming certified. These workshops employed about 250 workers and exported their wares to the United States, Canada, South America and Europe.

Although the Spaniards introduced this type of pottery, ironically the term Talavera is used much more in Mexico than in Talavera de la Reina, Spain, its namesake. In 1997, the Denominación de Origin de la Talavera was established to regulate what pieces could be officially called Talavera. Requisites included the city of production, the clay that was used, and the manufacturing methods. These pieces now carry holograms. One of the reasons the federal law was passed was that the remaining Talavera workshops had maintained the high quality and crafting process from the early colonial period, and the goal was to protect the tradition.

However, the tradition still struggles. Angelica Moreno, owner of Talavera de la Reina, is concerned that the tradition of the craft is waning, despite her workshop's efforts. One problem the craft faces is the lack of young people who are interested in learning it. An artisan earns about 700 to 1,800 pesos a week, which is not enough to meet expenses.

== Museum exhibitions ==
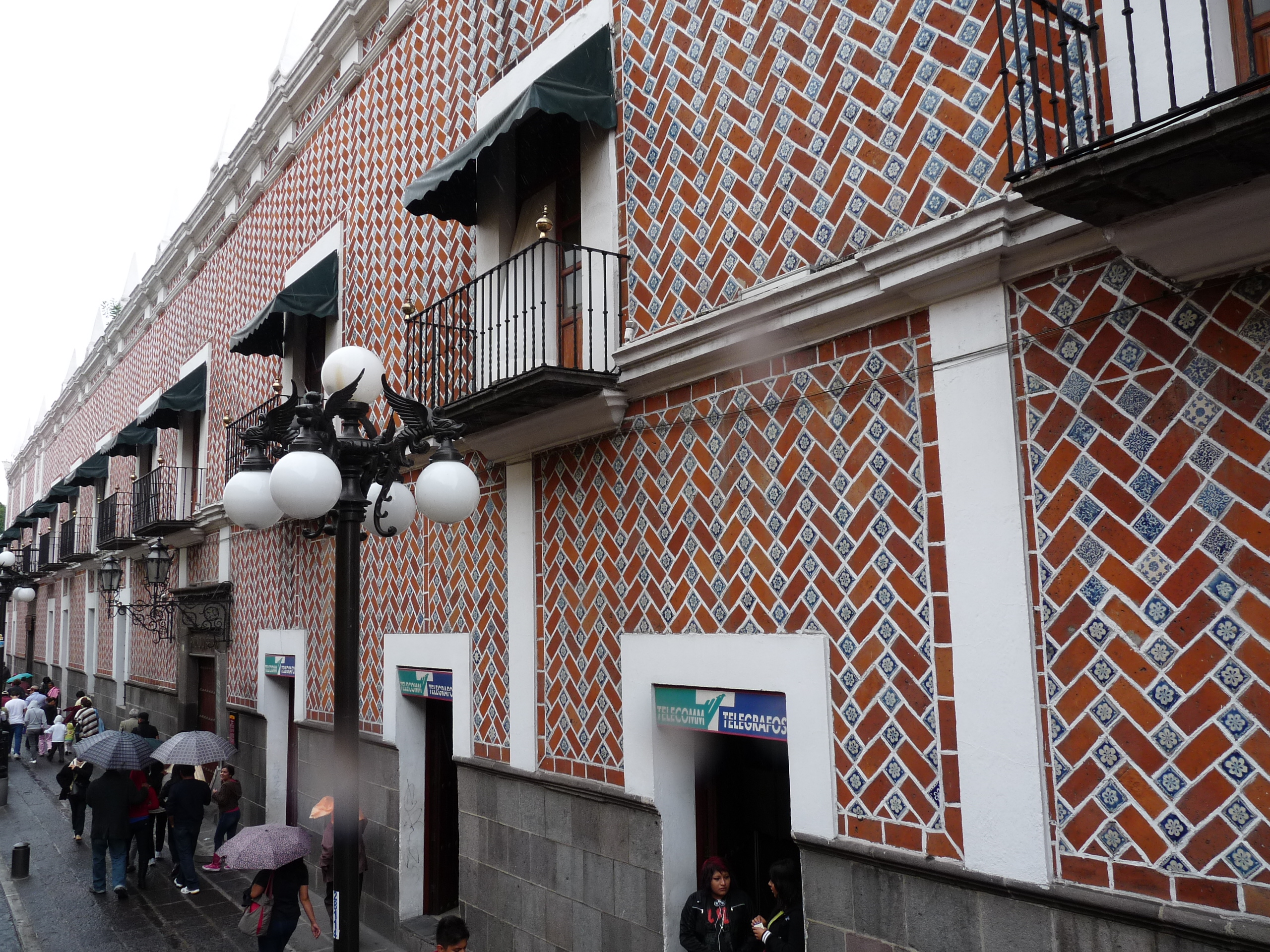
Colonial Talavera tiles in the exterior façade of the Biblioteca Palafoxiana, Puebla City

In the early 20th century, interest developed in collecting the work. In 1904, an American by the name of Emily Johnston de Forrest discovered Talavera on a trip to Mexico. She became interested in collecting the works, so she consulted scholars, local collectors and dealers. Eventually, her collection became the base of what is currently exhibited in the Metropolitan Museum of Art in New York. Her enthusiasm was passed onto Edwin Atlee Barber, the curator of the Philadelphia Museum of Art. He, too, spent time in Mexico and introduced Talavera into the Pennsylvania museum's collection. He studied the major stylistic periods and how to distinguish the best examples, publishing a guide in 1908 which is still considered authoritative.

During this time period, important museum collections were being assembled in Mexico as well. One of the earliest and most important was the collection of Francisco Perez Salazer in Mexico City. A bit later, in the 1920s, Franz Mayer, a German-born stockbroker, started his collection. In Puebla, he was considered a bit crazy for buying all of the "old stuff" from the locals. In 1986, the Franz Mayer Museum opened in Mexico City with the largest collection of Talavera Poblana in the world – 726 pieces from the 17th through the 19th century, and some 20th-century pieces by Enrique Luis Ventosa. In Puebla, José Luis Bello y González and his son José Mariano Bello y Acedo sought the advice of Ventosa in starting their collection. They amassed the largest and most important collection in the city which now is housed in the José Luis Bello y González Museum (Bello Museum).

More recently, the Museo de la Talavera (Talavera Museum) has been established in the city of Puebla, with an initial collection of 400 pieces. The museum is dedicated to recounting the origins, history, expansions and variations in the craft. Pieces include some of the simplest and most complex, as well as those representing different eras.

Several temporary and travelling exhibits of certain themes have been created from these permanent collections. One of these was called "El Aguila en la Historia de Mexico" (The Eagle in the History of Mexico). The forty-two-piece exhibit was sponsored by the Senate of Mexico to show how the eagle symbol has been used in the country throughout its history. This exhibit was sponsored in honor of the Bicentennial of Independence in 2010. These ceramics were chosen because of their combination of art and utility. Eagles depicted include that of Mexico's coat of arms, as well as those of political figures such as José María Morelos y Pavón and Porfirio Díaz, and those used by institutions such as the Royal and Pontifical University of Mexico and the Mexican Senate itself.

Another exhibit in Mexico centered on the creation of maps using Talavera tile. Most tiles during the colonial period were decorated with flowers and landscapes but a significant number were painted to create murals with maps. Those that survive show how a number of cities developed over the colonial period. Eight of the most representative 16th-century Talavera tile maps were at the El Carmen Museum at an exhibit called "Cartografia: Una Vision en Talavera del Mexico Colonial" (Cartography: A Talavera Vision of Colonial Mexico). This exhibit was of reproductions of the originals created by the Talavera de la Luz workshop in Puebla. The chosen maps show the development of Mexico City as well as representations of the Acapulco, Puebla and the Tesuco regions during this time period.

Exhibits have been held outside of Mexico as well. The Museum of the Americas in Spain held an exhibit called "Talaveras de Puebla, Cerámica colonial Mexicana. Siglos XVII a XXI" (Talavera Pottery of Puebla, Mexican colonial ceramics, XVII to 21st centuries). This was a temporary exhibit of 49 pieces, combined with pieces from Spain and China as references. The pieces were loaned by the Franz Mayer Museum and the Bello Museum.

== See also ==
- Mexican handcrafts and folk art
- Mexican pottery and ceramics
- Azulejo
- Cesar Torres Ramírez
- Cayetano Corona Gaspariano
- Uriarte Talavera
- Talavera de la Reina pottery
