= Marcela Lobo Crenier =

Mexican painter

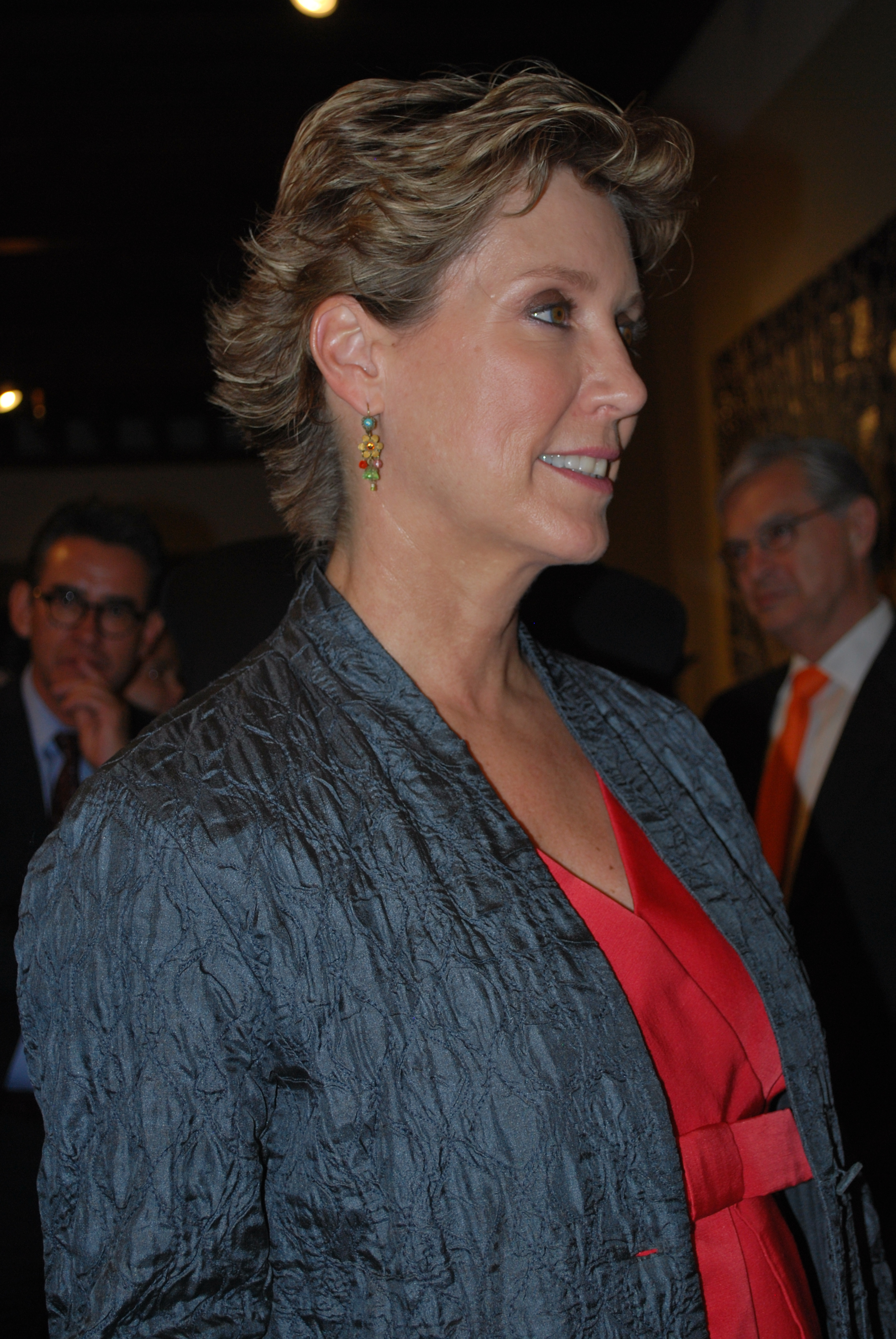
- Marcela Lobo at the Franz Mayer Museum
- Born: September 12, 1959 (age 66); Mexico City
- Occupation: artist

Marcela Lobo Crenier (born September 12, 1959), is a Mexican artist from Mexico City whose work is distinguished by the depiction of everyday objects in strong, bright colors, often using color schemes associated with Mexico. She began her career in 1986 in Cancun doing etching, but she moved to Mexico City in 1991 and changed her focus to painting. Most of her work is acrylics on canvas, but she is also noted for painting ceramics with Uriarte Talavera. Her work includes additional mediums such as painted wood, self-made ceramics, collages, and shoe decoration. She has been exhibited both individually and collectively in Mexico, Europe, and the United States.

== Life ==
Marcela Lobo Crenier was born on September 12, 1959 in Mexico City. Her father is an architect and her mother is a chef of French heritage. Lobo began making art at a young age and remembers her childhood filled with cut paper, glue, scissors, and making objects of bright colors. She considers her talent to be a family inheritance, sharing her artistic interests with her sister Adriana who is also a painter. She views this as a similarity that bonds them rather than creating a rivalry.

Lobo studied art and design at the Universidad Motolina in Mexico City. She later took classes in photography and figure drawing at the Centro Cultural Arte Contemporaneo de México and studied painting at Mercedes Escobar's workshop. She continues to attend workshops and courses in various mediums such as ceramics and collage. However, she attributes most of her experience to painting for eight hours every day and learning through trial and error.

== Career ==
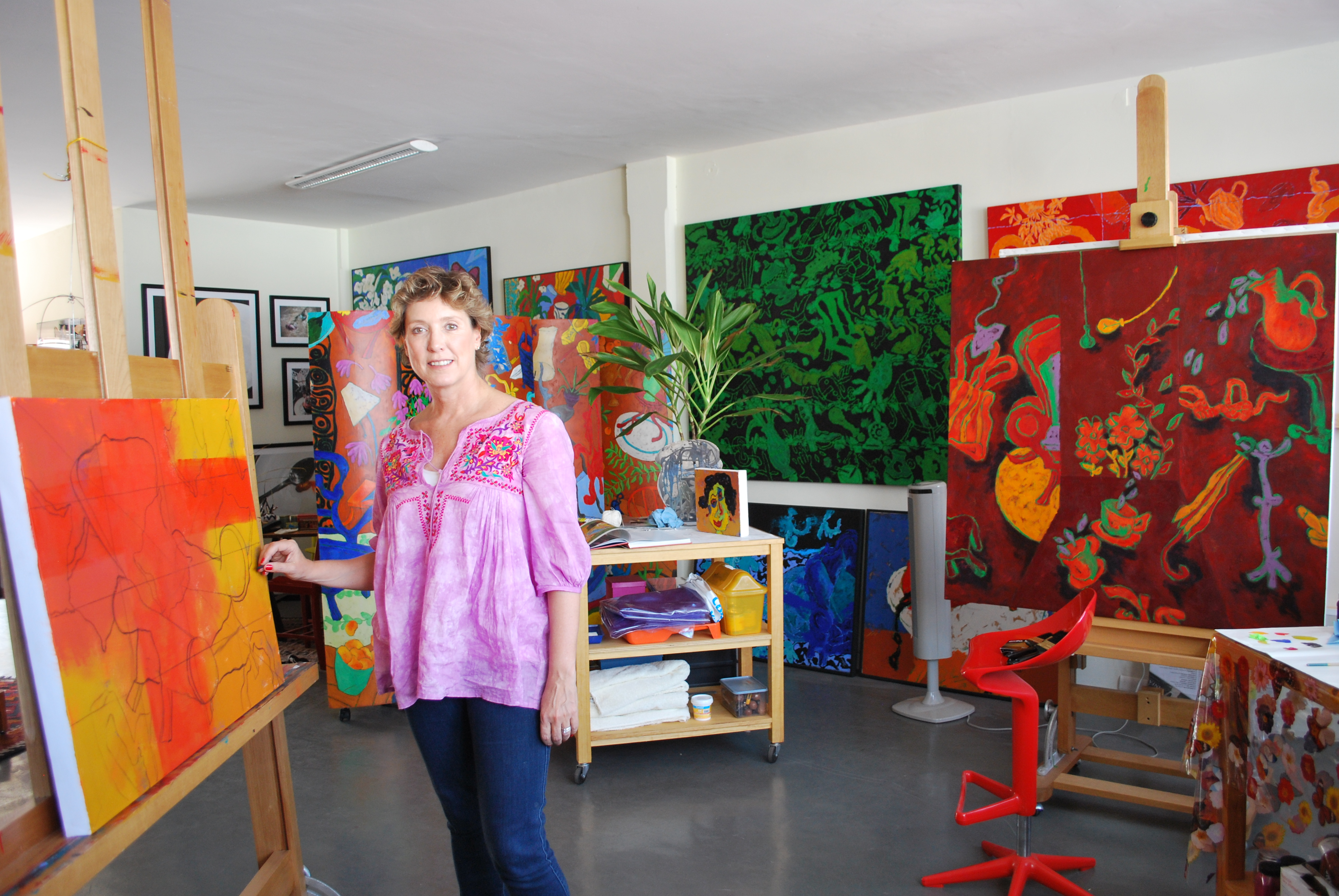
Marcela Lobo Crenier at her studio in Mexico City.

Lobo began her career in 1986 doing etching and started her own business in Cancun. At the time, there was no art scene in Cancun, and the city's development had not yet gained momentum. She had no teachers or broader art community to help her develop, and she occasionally networked through friends and family in other locations to get enough work to survive.

In 1991, Lobo moved back to her hometown of Mexico City. There, she attended an etching workshop with notable masters of the craft such as José Luis Cuevas, Manuel Felguérez, and Carmen Parra. In addition to creating her own etchings, she has collaborated on projects in places such as the Centro Cultural Arte Contemporáneo, Mercedes Escobar's workshop in Mexico City, and Gorky González's Alfartía Traditional workshop in Guanajuato. Notably, she has a collaborative relationship with Uriarte Talavera and most recently participated with them in the El Cinco de Mayo de 1862 exhibition, which honors the 150th anniversary of the Battle of Puebla.

Lobo has had numerous collective exhibitions and several individual ones that consist of collections of paintings, particularly acrylics on canvas but also including paintings on wood, collages, ceramic pieces, and decorated shoes. Her first individual exhibit was in 1991 at the Club Porto Bravo in Valle de Bravo; since then, she has primarily displayed her work in Mexico, Europe, and the United States.

Showings in Mexico include:

- Orbe Galerías de Arte in Cancun (1993 and 1997)
- Naturalezas Viva at the Casa de Diálogo of the Teatro de México (1995)
- II Biennial Internacional de Arte Contemporáneo in Mexico City (1998)
- El Color de México at the Secretaría de Desarrollo Social
- Galería Kin in Mexico City (1999)
- De Mil Colores at the gallery of the Mexico City airport (2001)
- 18 a Todo Color at Televisa Guadalajara (2003)
- El Color de lo Cotidiano at the Museo Dolores Olmedo (2003)
- Una Fiesta para los Sentidos at the Galería de Arte de Oaxaca (2004)
- Allá Lejos y Tiempo Atrás at Casa Lamm Mexico City (2006)

International shows include:

- La Coleur du Mexique at the Mexican embassy in Paris (1997)
- A Côr do México at the Palace of Independence in Lisbon (1998)
- La Antigua art Gallery in Antigua Guatemala (2002)
- The Mexican consulate in Chicago (2011)
- The Defoor Center in Atlanta (2011)
- The Jadite Gallery in New York (2011).

She has also participated in several collective exhibitions. This includes the 1999 exhibition Bodegones at Galería Kin with her sister Adriana Lobo. Other collective exhibitions include early shows in Quintana Roo such as the IV Exposición de Artes Plásticas, the Feria del Arte of the Colegio Americano, the Centro Cultural de Arte Contemporaneo, and Arte de Nuevo Milenio at the Florida Museum of Hispanic and Latin American Art in 2000. An important individual showing was Significación at the Museo de Bellas Artes in Toluca in 2010, inaugurated by the then-governor of the state Enrique Peña Nieto. It includes images painted on columns, folding screens and wood, both painted and collage.

Her European showings have almost entirely been in France, with shows sold out in Paris and Lisbon, but her work has been sold to others on that continent and can be found in collections in various countries. She believes her colorful work is popular in Europe because it has a warmth which can be missing in cold climates. Three catalogs of her work have been published, El color de lo cotidiano, from 2003 showing at the Dolores Olmedo Museum, Sitios, Espacio y Objetos in 2008 and Significaciones from her 2010 Toluca show.

In addition to her individual and collective shows, her career has included giving numerous classes in workshops such as thosededicated to engraving at the Ediciones Multiarte from 1989 to 1994, at Monumentos Conmemoratives from 1990 to 1992 and to the present at her own workshop. She has also worked as the personal secretary to a director of the Instituto Nacional de Bellas Artes and currently works as a special events coordinator for Museo Nacional de Arte.

== Artistry ==
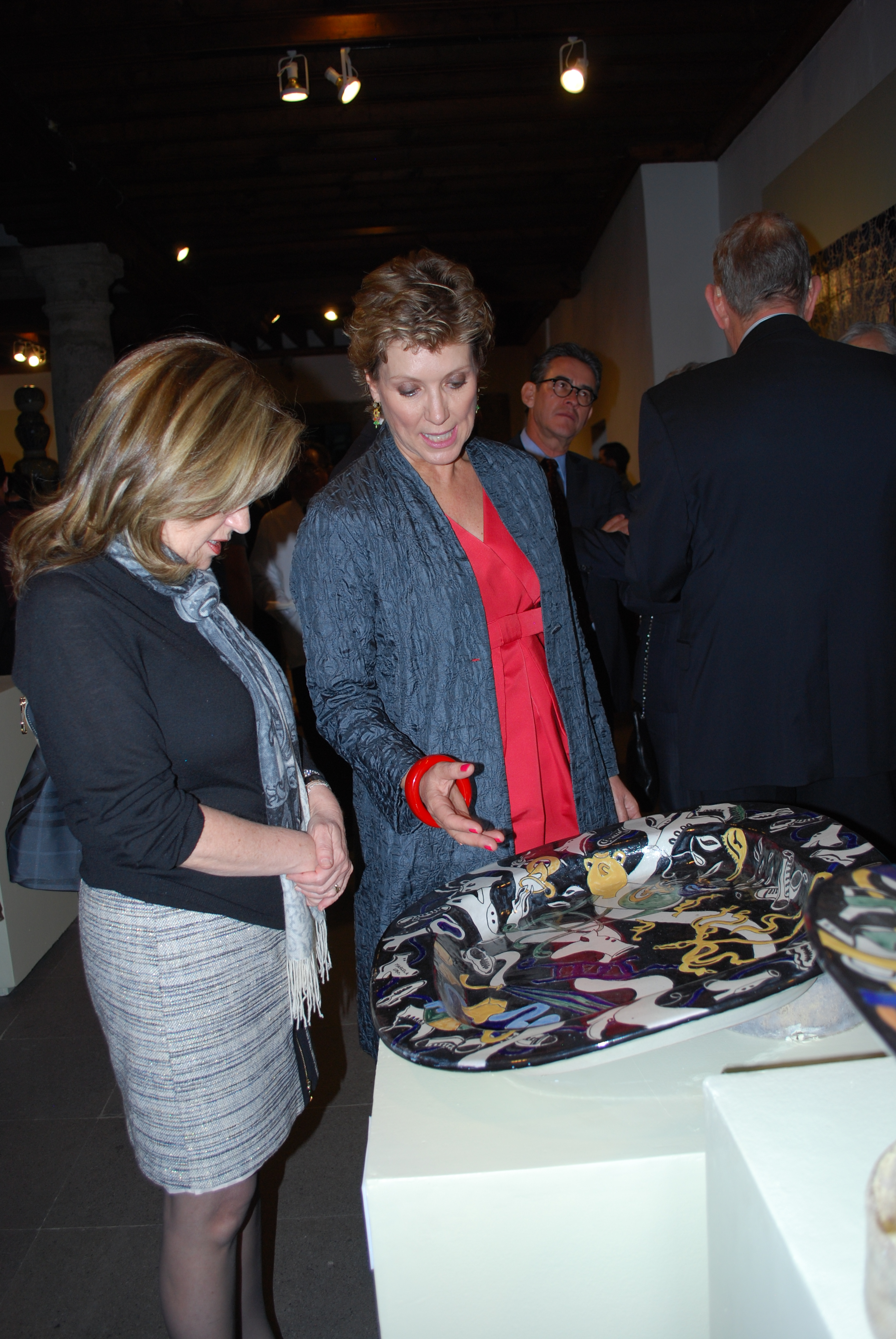
Artist demonstrating her work at the opening of a Uriarte Talavera exhibit at the Franz Mayer Museum.

Her professional art production began with etchings while still in Cancun, moving into her primary mode of painting in 1991 after moving to Mexico City. However, her work still includes etching and has expanded to include ceramics, photography, interior design, drawing the human figure, painting Talavera and serigraphy. Her preference is to work with acrylics as they allow her to trace outlines easily, dry rapidly, are odorless and do not pollute. She does not make preliminary sketches before painting, with the only preliminary work being the tracing of lines on the canvas to assure balance in the composition.

Her work mostly focuses on painting still lifes and objects in general, as she states that she does not really like the human figure. Her focus is on ordinary objects which she sees mostly at people’s houses, restaurants and other locations which her daily life takes her. She states that she prefers objects that people generally do not give a second thought to and give her enough in her memory to work eight hours a day. These objects include furniture, flower vases, fruit, flowers, bird cages, handcrafts, toys, toothbrushes, combs, perfume bottles, dishes and handbags. One example of painting from memory and experience was that after a trip to the Lacondon Jungle, tropical vegetation appeared in her work.

While the objects in her work are ordinary, her color scheme is distinguished by the used of bright strong colors, with an emphasis on those related to Mexico. She says she has been attracted to bright colors since she was a child and she prefers them now because of how they reflect light and the quality they give her images. She cites as influences Matisse, Cézanne, Van Gogh and María Izquierdo. She states that much of her work is her interpretation of theirs.

She describes her work as costumbrista and even naïve, in the sense that the forms are simple and uncomplicated, but with a poetic view of the world. Her work has also been described as a homage to the country’s handcraft and folk art tradition . Her work has been praised by notable figures in Mexico such as Jacobo Zabludovsky, Andrés Henestrosa, Magda Carranza and Ricardo Legorreta . Writer Jacobo Zabludovsky stated that her works are always cheerful, playing with color and light, never having lost her sense of childish wonder. She has stated that the purpose of her work is enjoyment, not to make anyone uncomfortable. One example of this was a small exhibit of her work at the cancer ward of the ABC Hospital in 2004, sponsored by a patient aid charity to bring color to that section of facility.
