= Silvia Barbescu =

Romanian multi-disciplinary artist

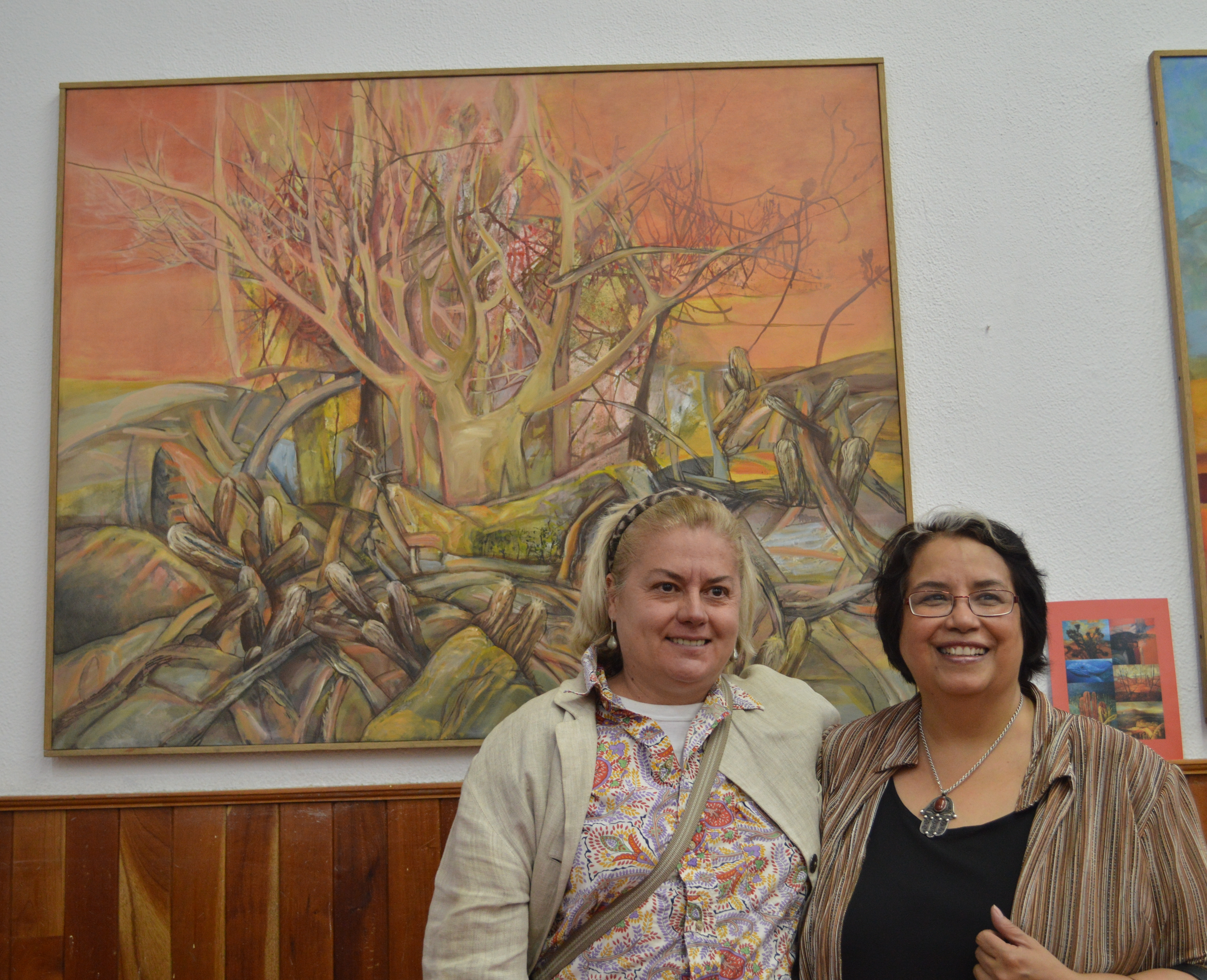
Barbescu (left) with Lilia Cardenas at the Mujeres en el Arte exhibit at the Casa de Coahuila in Mexico City

Silvia Barbescu (born 1961) is a Romanian multi-disciplinary artist who has been developing her career in Mexico since 2000, after being invited to the country by the Mexican government. Preferring to work with mixed media and mixed techniques, with images based on nature, her work has been recognized by various awards as well as membership in the Salón de la Plástica Mexicana and the Sistema Nacional de Creadores de Arte in Mexico.

== Life ==
Barbescu was born in Bucharest, Romania, growing up during the communist era.

She attended the Nicolae Grigorescu Art Academy in Bucharest from 1980 to 1985, graduating with a degree in mural and art restoration.

Although free to leave the country after the end of communism, she remained in Romania until 2000, when she went to Mexico as part of a grant. She became fascinated by the country and its culture, deciding to stay. She received a scholarship from the Secretaría de Relaciones Exteriores to study her master's degree in visual arts at the Academy of San Carlos from 2001 to 2003.

== Career ==
She began her art career under a communist dictatorship, which was relatively liberal in what it allowed artists to produce. She began by working on various restoration projects, mostly on mural in Orthodox churches, but she also created a number of her own murals in various parts of Romania. This work prompted her to focus on depictions of the forests of Transylvania and other parts of the country.

In 2000, she received a grant and an invitation from the Mexican government to work on projects at the Escuela Nacional de Pintura, Escultura y Grabado "La Esmeralda" in Mexico City and has since continued her career in this country. In 2005, she founded a workshop called “Intaglio Atelier Gráfica Contemporánea” which is dedicated to production and teaching of graphic arts as well as sculpture, painting, ceramics and glass work. Its production includes two murals which are now located at the IMSS hospital in Toluca (2007) and the ISSSTE hospital in Puebla (2009). Since 2010, she has taught drawing, printing and painting at La Esmeralda.

Barbescu has had over seventeen individual exhibitions and has participated in numerous collective ones in Romania, Germany, Holland, Israel and Mexico. In 2013, she had an individual exhibition called El jardín del desdén” at La Esmeralda, which featured images of animals, insects and plants with an environmental message.

She has received prizes, grants and residencies in Poland, Bulgaria, Holland and Mexico, including a grant from the Secretaría de Relaciones Exteriores, a scholarship to study at the Academy of San Carlos from the same institution, various grants from the government of Mexico City and the XII Diego Rivera Drawing and Print Biennal in Guanajuato.

In addition, she has been accepted as a member of the Salón de la Plástica Mexicana and the Sistema Nacional de Creadores de Arte.

== Artistry ==
Barbescu is a multi-disciplinary artist, working in print, painting, ceramics, glass and enamel. She prefers to work with mixed media and mixed techniques, resolving problems that such present. One example is the use of print and ceramic for Geografías y memoria, sponsored and created in collaboration with Uriarte Talavera.

Barbescu's works focus on nature and complicated organic forms, an extension of her earlier work depicting forests. She creates analogies between nature and what it means to be human, with the aim of depicting what is internal and cannot be seen. Her work is humanistic with elements of abstract expression.
