= Demián Flores =

Mexican artist

- Born: Demián Flores Cortés; 1971 (age 53–54); Juchitán, Oaxaca Mexico
- Notable work: in museums: Casa de las Américas, Havana, Cuba; Vermont Studio Center, Johnson, Vermont; Museo José Guadalupe Posada, Aguascalientes, Mexico

Demián Flores Cortés (Juchitán de Zaragoza, Oaxaca; 1971) is a contemporary Mexican artist who works in multiple media. He has worked in graphic arts, painting, serigraphy and more producing work which often mixes images from his rural childhood home of Juchitán with those related to modern Mexico City. It also often including the mixture of pop culture images with those iconic of Mexico's past. Much of Flores’ work has been associated with two artists’ workshops he founded in Oaxaca called La Curtiduría and the Taller Gráfica Actual. This work has included events related to the 2006 uprising in Oaxaca and the restoration of an 18th-century church. His work has been exhibited in Mexico City, Europe, Guatemala and Cuba.

== Life ==
Demián Flores Cortés was born in Juchitán de Zaragoza, Oaxaca in 1971. He is from a family involved in commercial activities, with his grandfather owning a large department store in the town's main square. He spent most of his childhood at this store, fascinated by the images in catalogs. As a young child he was very serious, quiet and attentive to what was happening around him, and kept to him self so much so that his parents once took him to a doctor because they thought there was something wrong. His fascination with images led him to drawing and he found himself occupied with this for hours.

When he was thirteen his family moved to Mexico City, living at first in the Colonia Navarte neighborhood, later in Villa Coapa. Juchitán is a regional commercial center but culturally very distinct from Mexico City, with its matriarchal society (women hold most of the social and economic power) and its acceptance of gays and transgender people. He calls himself a “Juchilango” which is a combination of “Juchitan” and “chilango,” a slang term for used to designate people from Mexico City. He says his sense of humor came later in his life as a way to deal with contradictions and ironies.

He received his bachelor's in Visual Arts from the Escuela Nacional de Artes Plásticas, which is part of the Universidad Nacional Autónoma de México. Since then, he has received further training in workshops and residencies in Europe and the United States.

He currently resides in the city of Oaxaca, spends considerable time in Mexico City and maintains studios in Juchitán, the city of Oaxaca and Mexico City.

== Career ==
After graduating from college, he moved to the city of Oaxaca in 1996 in order to found a workshop and cultural center. He found an old tannery in Jalatlaco, a neighborhood which was famous for producing leather. The organization founded here was named La Curtiduría (the tannery) and has since been the scene of a number of collaborations such as La Calavera Oaxaqueña, a homage to José Guadalupe Posada and a collaboration of artists to express their views of the 2006 Oaxaca protests. In 2007, it received support from the Alfredo Harp Helú Foundation to expand its work including residencies, educational program and the production of art exhibitions. These have included a congress of women artists, the restoration of an 18th-century church and collaborations with Casa Lamm in Mexico City. La Curtiduría also is a publishing house which has published two catalogs of Flores’ work: "Aquí no pasa nada" and "stencilatinoAMERICA" both in 2007. He has worked on the illustrations for many publications linked to these activities.

The largest project Flores did with Curtiduría was the restoration of the Santa Ana Zegache, located near the city of Oaxaca, working in cooperation with Georgina Saldaña Wonchee and sponsored by the Rodolfo Morales Cultural Foundation.

Flores also convinced twenty artists to donate works to be sold to raise money for the restoration effort in Zegache and convinced a number of his friends to participate directly in the work. The project not only included the restoration of furniture, fixings and artwork to their original condition, it also included the creation of new artwork using the church as a theme and the establishment of training workshops to teach young people in the area the skills needed for the work. Flores and other artists created new artworks for the church as well as for exhibition at Casa Lamm in Mexico City. Some of these works included those with gold leaf and those made with the leavings from the restoration work.

In 2008, Flores created a new organization called the Taller Gráfica Actual in the city of Oaxaca. The purpose of this organization is to serve as an experimental space for traditional graphic mediums such as lithography, etching and serigraphy but with contemporary designs. Artists affiliated with this workshop have shown their work in places such as Florence, Italy, and New York and has offered workshops by names such as Francisco Castro Leñero and Luis Ricaurte. It has also collaborated with the Tamarind Institute in New Mexico and Nopal Press in California, publishing a number of books related to art and graphics.

Main individuals exhibitions of his work include De/construcción de una Nación at the Instituto de Bellas Artes (2012), Estucos at Casa Lamm (2012), Mix Teco Sound at Galería Estación Cero in Oaxaca (2012), Estarcidos at Galería Ginocchio (2011), La Patria at Galerie Talmart in Paris (2011), Demián Flores at the Festival Río Loco in Toulouse (2011), Cómo Ser Goleador in various parts of South America (2011), VS at the Centro de Formación de la Cooperación Española in Antigua Guatemala (2010), La Patria at Casa Lamm (2010), Epigrafía at the Museo de Arte Moderno in Mexico City (2010), El Triunfo at Galería Ethra (2010), Talayi at the Escuela de Beisbol in San Bartolo Coyotepec (permanent exhibition), Aztlán at Museo de Arte Carrillo Gil and Instituto de Artes Gráficas de Oaxaca(2009), Zegache at Galería Drexel in Monterrey and Casa Lamm in Mexico City (2009), Juchilango at Casa Lamm (2008), Bidxaá at Galeria Manuel García in Oaxaca (2007), Pinturas at Galería Hilario Galguera in Mexico City (2007), Arena México at the Museo de la Ciudad de México and others (2006), Match Dual Presence at Universidad Autónoma de Baja California -CECUT in Tijuana and Fisher Gallery USC (2006), Defensa Personal Drexel Galería Monterrey (2005), Novena at the Eduardo Vasconcelos Baseball Park in Oaxaca (2004), Lulú at the Canvas International Art in Amsterdam (2004), Playbol! at Casa Lamm (2004), Mont Albán at Casa Lamm (2001), Cambio de Piel at Galería Quetzalli in Oaxaca (2001), Arena Oaxaca, at the Instituto de Artes Gráficas de Oaxaca (2000), Sedimento at Casa Lamm (1999), Resistencia Florida in Casa de las Americas, Havana (1999) .

Publications of his work include Demián Flores Dibujos/Drawings (2012), El Triunfo (2010), Gráfica Popular de Lucha Libre (2010), Villancicios de Santo Niño de las Quemaduras (2009), Cómo ser Goleador (2009), Zoobituario (2009), Aztlán (2008), La Patria (2008) .

Flores’ main permanent display is called Talavi, a group of pieces created for the inaugurated of the inauguration of the Alfredo Harp Helú baseball academy in San Bartolo Coyotepec in 2009. The works all have a baseball theme.

He participated in the Primer Encuentro de Gráfica y Escritura called “Libre tiraje,” a conference dedicated to dialogue and reflection on the graphic arts. This was part of the XXIX Feria Internacional del Libre in 2009 in Oaxaca. Residencies and grants have included Cité Internacionale des Arts, Paris (2002), London Print Studio (2004), Jóvenes Creadores-FONCA (1995 and 1999), the Pollock-Krasner Foundation (2006), Fomento a Proyectos y Coinversiones Culturales for a project called la Gráfica como práctica Artística Contemporánea (2009) and since 2010, he has been a member of the Sistema Nacional de Creadores de Arte .

Awards include “La Joven Estampa” from the Casa de las Americas in Havana (1995), the Mex-Am Foundation/Vermont Studio Center (1999), XX Encuentro Nacional de Arte Joven and I Bienial Nacional de Estampa Rufino Tamayo, Oaxaca (2000).

== Artistry ==
Flores is one of Mexico's best known contemporary artists involved in multiple disciplines such as painting, graphic arts, drawing, serigraphy, video and art objects such as a modified automobile. In 2012, he collaborated with Uriarte Talavera to create ceramic pieces for an exhibition called Cinco de Mayo de 1862 in honor of the Battle of Puebla.

He says his work is anchored in the reality of contemporary Mexico although much of his formation as an artist was influenced by the artistic tradition of Francisco Toledo . His paintings have a dream-like quality and mix images from Mexico's past and present, such as the god Quetzalcoatl, pre Hispanic warriors, female fertility figures, pyramids, Benito Juárez and comic book characters. He frequently appropriates images from pop culture, especially baseball and lucha libre, but also Superman, Popeye, Bugs Bunny, Memín Pinguín, soccer players and prizefighters. In a serigraphy called “Tributos de Guerra” an elaborately adorned indigenous warrior has Elmer Fudd’s head on a spear.

He says much of the juxtaposition comes from his upbringing first in the traditional town of Juchitán and later in cosmopolitan Mexico City, both of which figure in his identity. One example this mixed identity are works and exhibitions which have mixed the various sports he played, from baseball and talavi in Juchitán to soccer and a game called bolillo in Mexico City. His mixed background allows him to move fluidly as an artist between images that are pre-Hispanic and modern, rural and urban, indigenous and pop culture. One of his focuses is the rescue and reinterpretation of Zapotec traditions to make them more contemporary.

As a oaxacan, he was able to draw inspiration from the 2006 uprising to create work like “Welcome to Oaxaca” for which he collaborated with five graffiti artists using stencils and spray paint to create a background which looks like a section of city wall. Over this includes images of Oaxaca governor Ulises Ruiz Ortiz . Flores believes that the events of 2006 have spawned changes in the art community of Oaxaca, with most breaking from the traditional Oaxaca painting styles established by Rodolfo Morales and Francisco Toledo. However, this split has been in two directions with one moving toward art for commercial purposes and the other toward art with social and political messages.
