= Talavera de la Reina pottery =

Traditional type of pottery from Spain

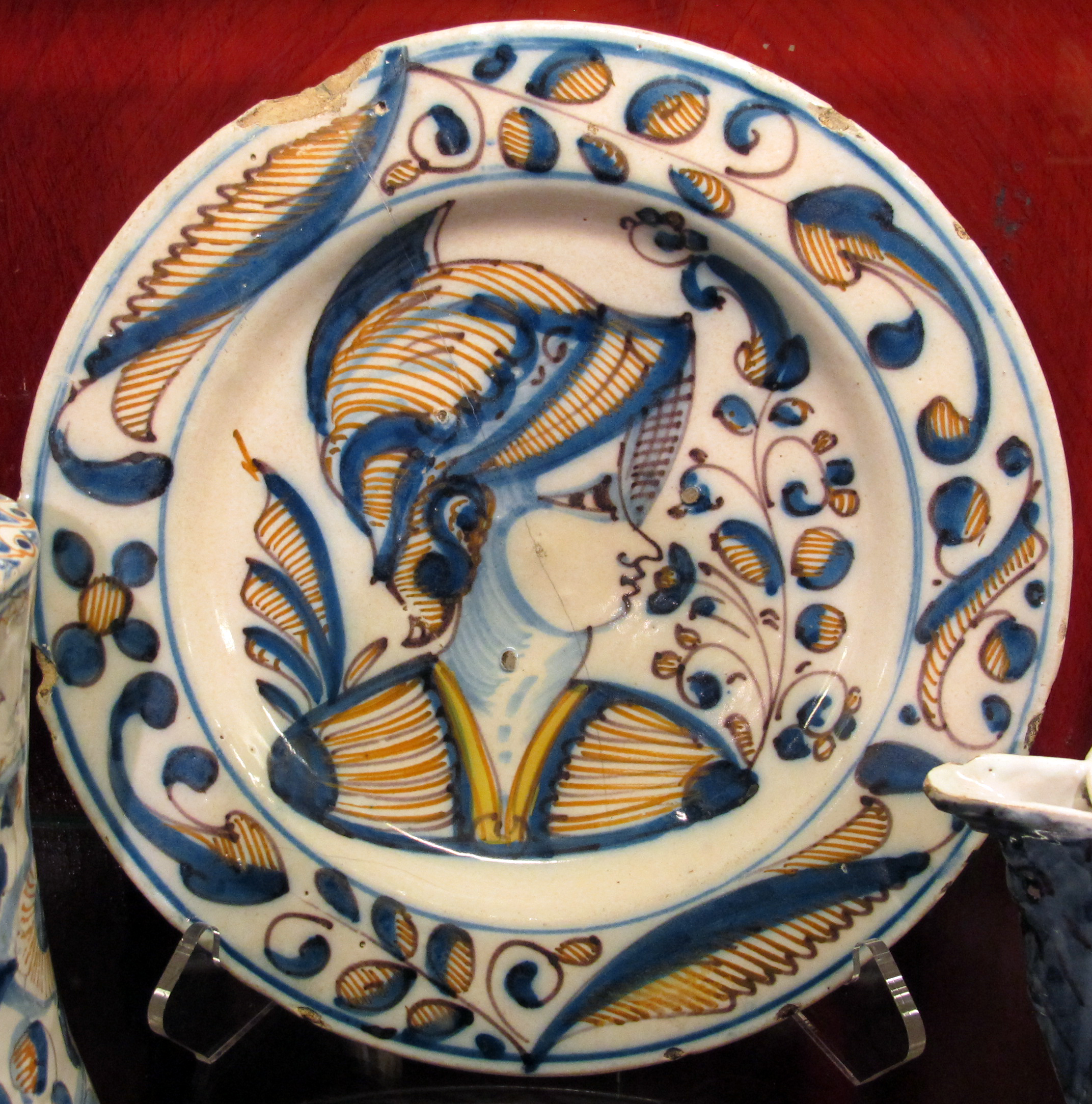
Plate, 1580–1650

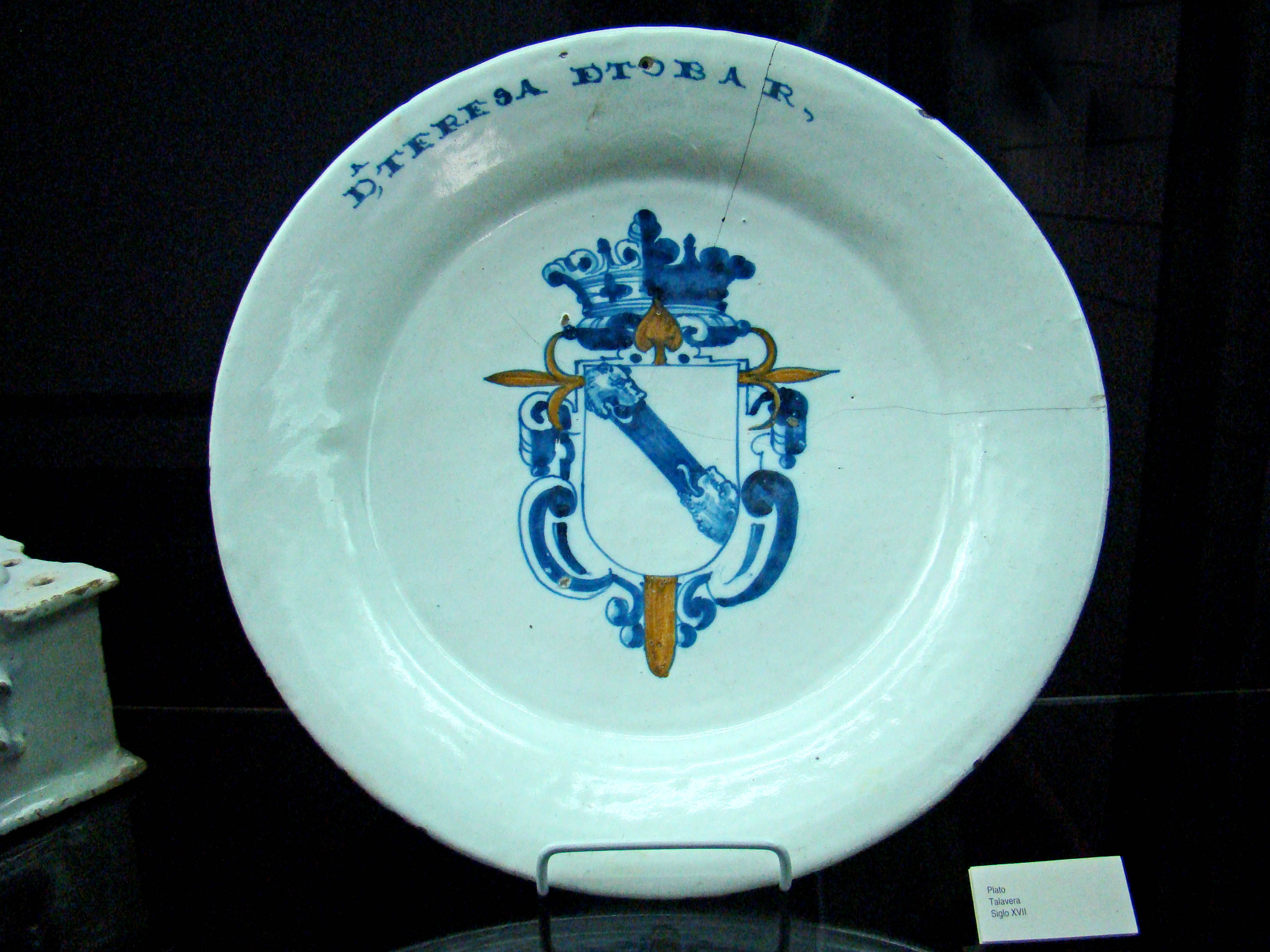
17th-century armorial plate

Talavera de la Reina pottery is a traditional type of faience, or tin-glazed earthenware made in Talavera de la Reina, Toledo, Spain. The area has a long history of pottery, and dishes, jars, ceramics and other objects have been found in archaeological excavations, some materials dating to the Roman Empire.

== History ==
Arabs brought to the city new techniques, including a new kind of kiln for firing pottery. During that era, many of the pieces included abstract motifs as prescribed by Muslim religious restrictions. In the fifteenth century, Jan Floris brought new styles from Holland. He founded a factory which started the pottery tradition of the city.

Ceramics of Talavera have been used to make fountains; examples exist in Cuba and Brazil. Tiles for buildings have been made; some are in New Orleans, Tokyo and Paris. Its presence in royal palaces and museums all over the world testify to its quality.

There are different styles of Talavera de la Reina Pottery:

- Baroque
- Renaissance
- Bird collections
- House collections
- Religious collections
- Hunting scenes

Workshops in the town keep up the pottery tradition, including Ruiz de Luna and Emilio Niveiro.

Mexican Talavera pottery comes from and is named after the Talavera de la Reina pottery.

== Examples ==
- Pottery made in 1334 for the Old Cathedral of Salamanca.
- The azulejos in the Golden Chapel, made in 1515, and other sites in the New Cathedral of Salamanca.
- Most of azulejos of the Ducal Palace of Vila Viçosa, Portugal made in the 17th century.
- Azulejos in a lot of defunct buildings of Guadalajara, Spain.

== Gallery ==
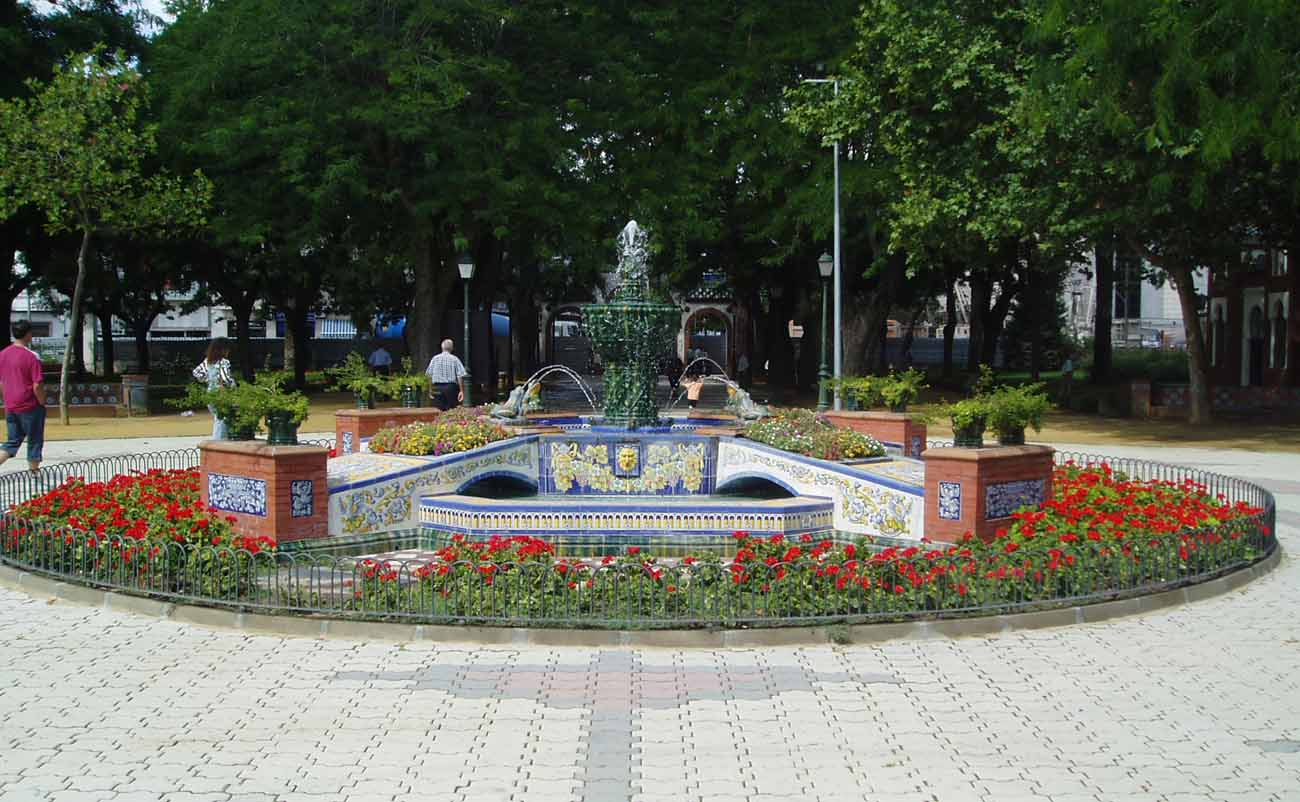
Frog fountain in Prados Gardens, Talavera de la Reina.

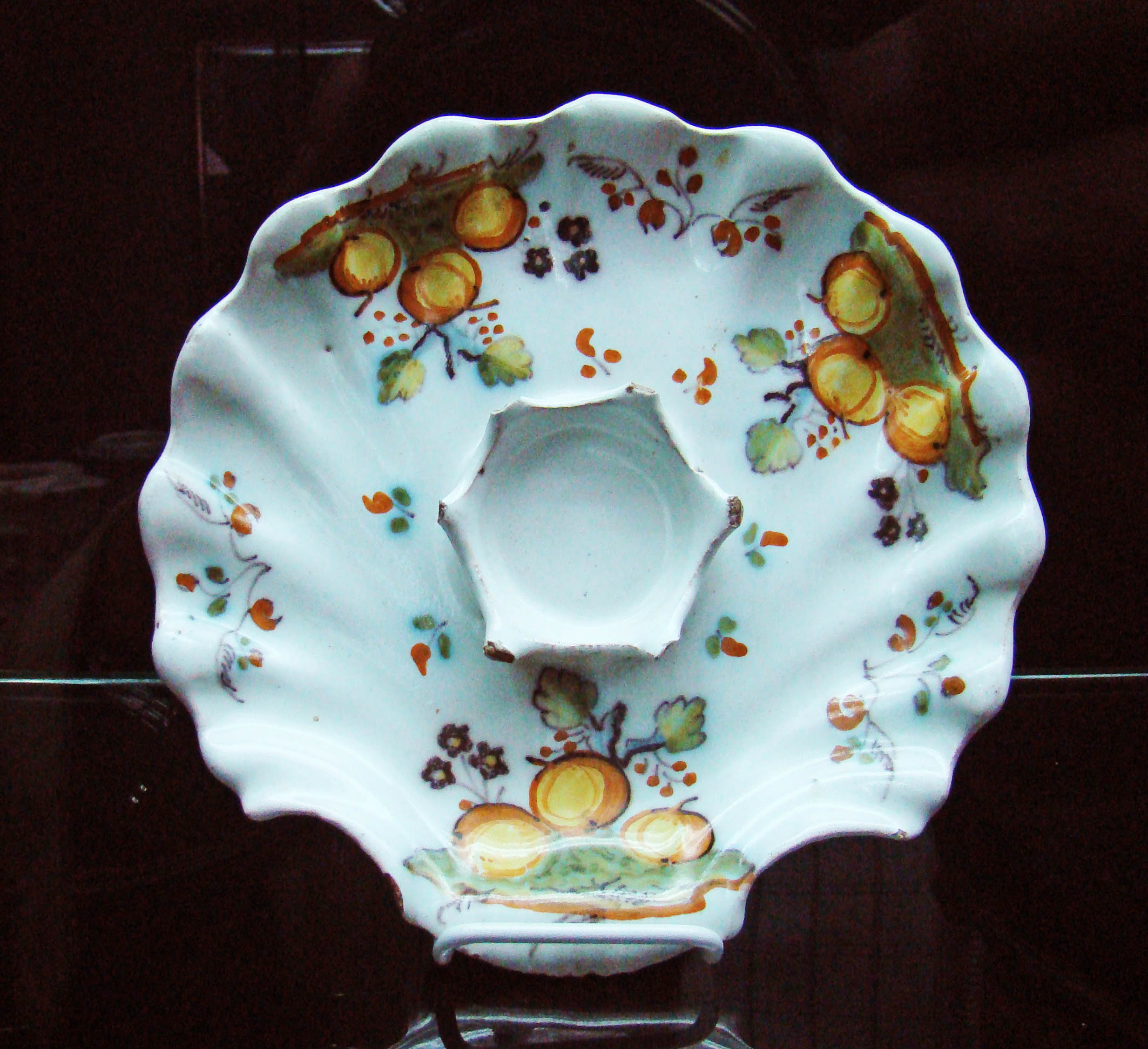
Ceramics from Talavera de la Reina, Toledo (Spain). Museum of Valladolid in the Fabio Nelli Palace.

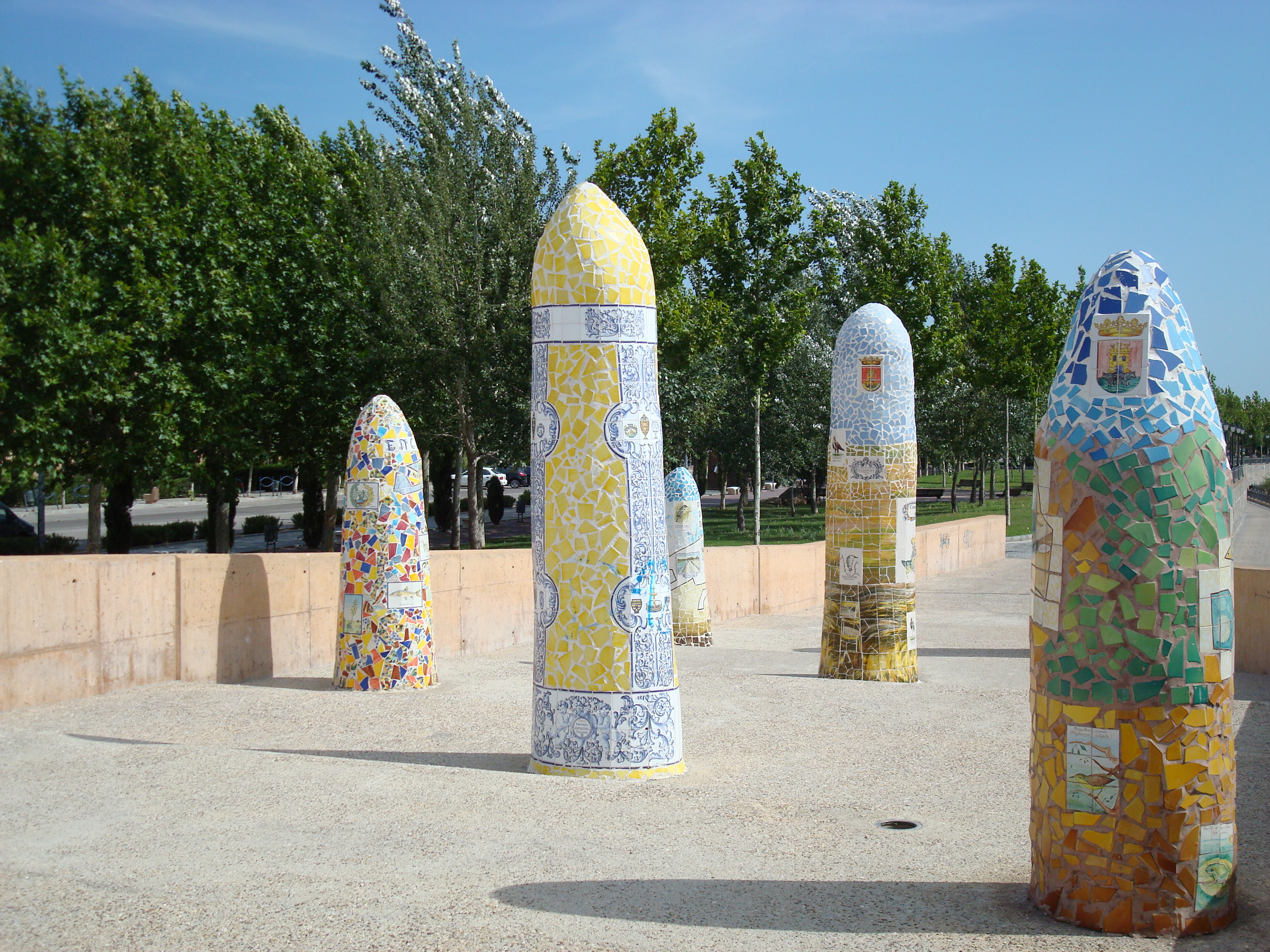
Talavera menhirs.
