= Uriarte Talavera =

Coordinates: 19°2′55.22″N 98°12′19.18″W

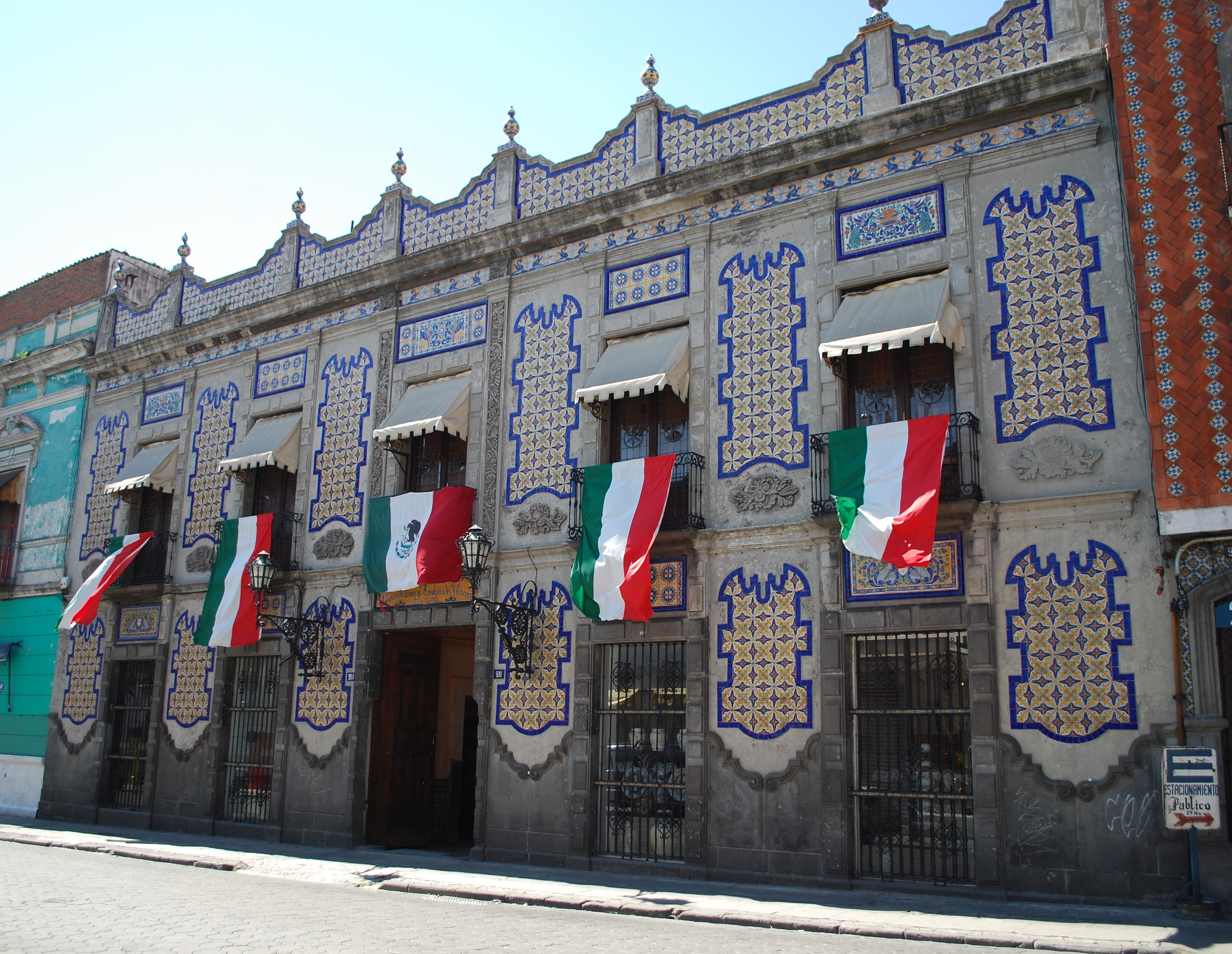
Facade of the Uriarte workshop in Puebla, Mexico

Uriarte Talavera is a traditional Talavera enterprise in the city of Puebla, Mexico, which has been in existence since 1824. It was begun as a family workshop by Dimas Uriarte, but today it is run by a business group. However, the enterprise still makes Talavera pottery using 16th century methods. Much of its work still uses traditional colors and designs, and eligible for certificates of authenticity by the Mexican government, but it has also experimented with new designs and forms since the early 20th century. This has included collaborating with various plastic artists to create modern designs and even artistic pieces.

== History ==
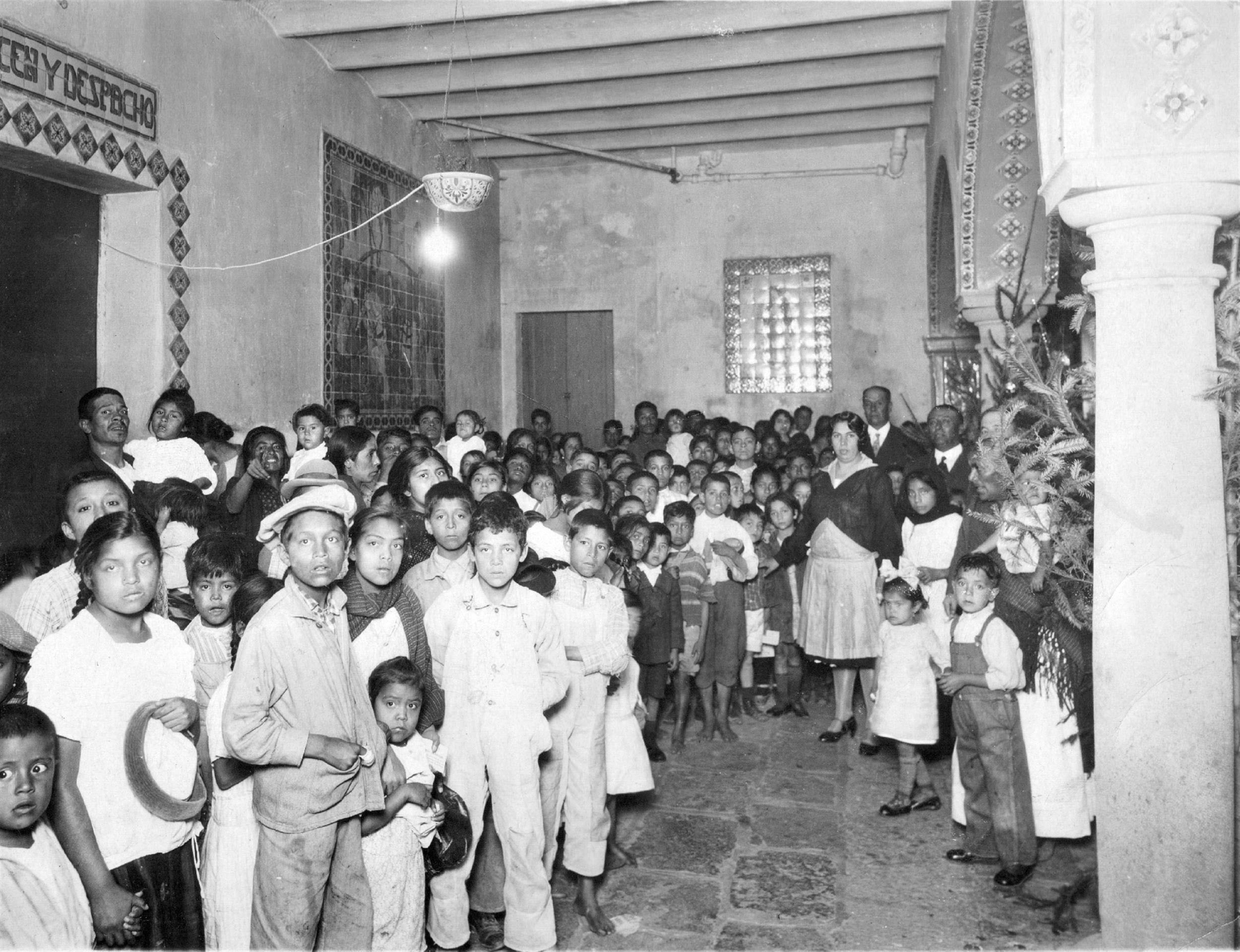
Photograph of Uriarte artisans taken in 1928

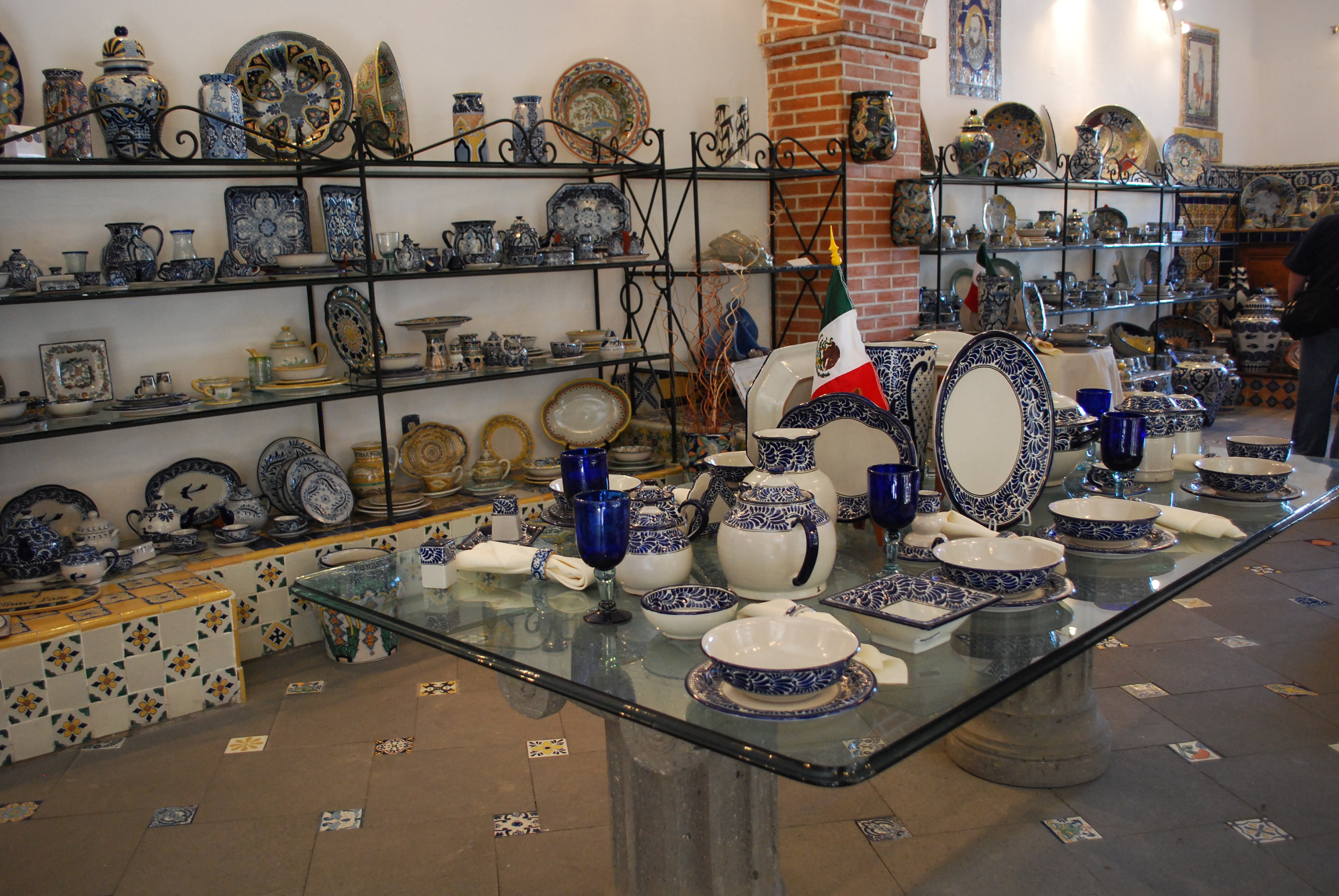
Display room inside Uriarte

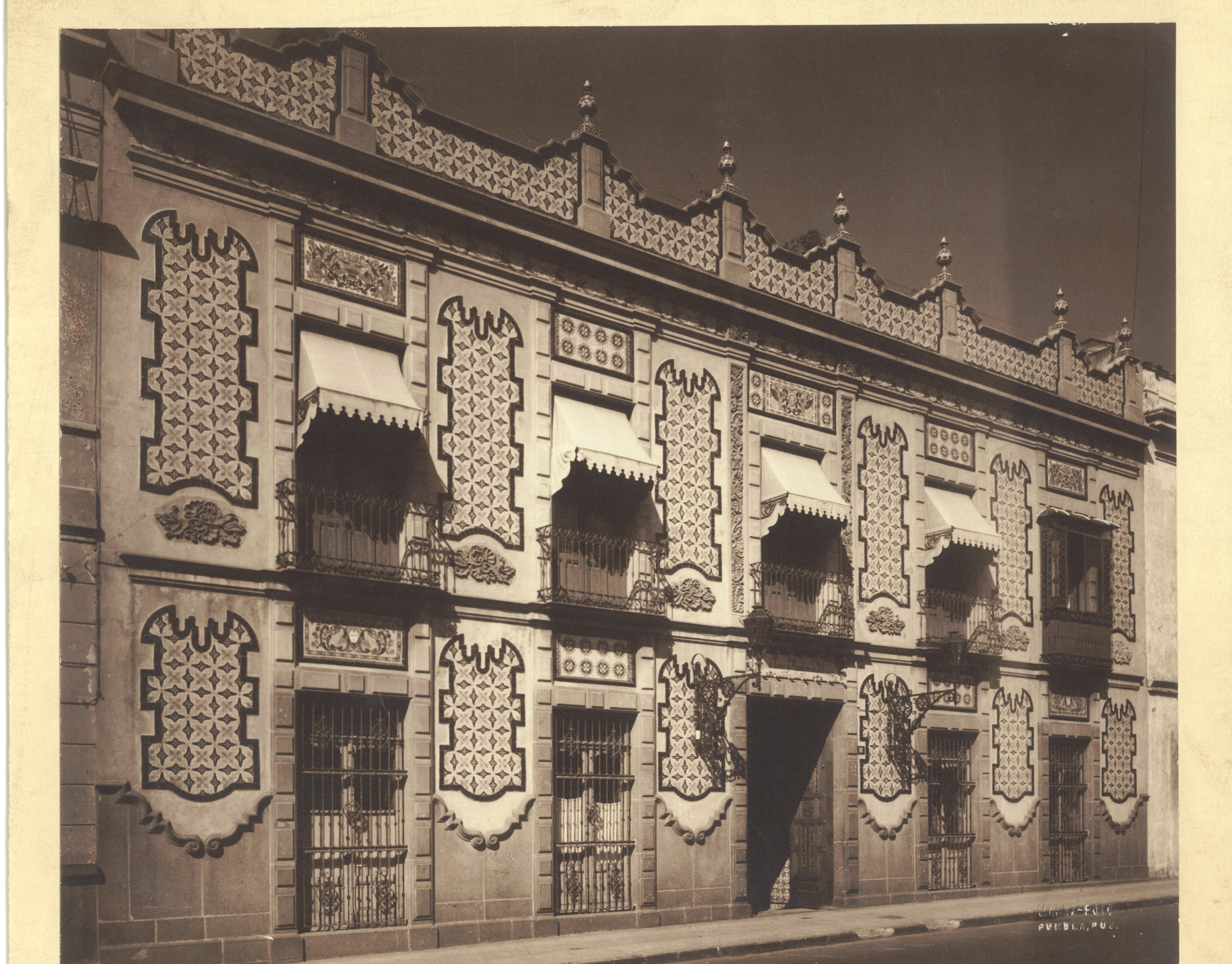
Photo of 1933 of Uriarte Talavera

Uriarte is one of the oldest producers of Talavera pottery in Mexico. This is a kind of majolica, named after the city of Talavera de la Reina which had developed in Spain from Arab and Chinese origins and brought to Mexico after the Spanish conquest of the Aztec Empire. While majolica was made in a number of places in Mexico, it became highly refined in the Puebla city area, especially from 1650 to 1750. Talavera work is distinguished by the fine clays found in this area, fired with a tin and lead glaze at high temperatures. This glaze is off white to slightly yellow. The decorations are done only in black, cobalt blue, blue, yellow, green, red and sometimes deep rose, with the design slightly fuzed with the glaze which crazes. Authentic Talavera is still made by the same 16th century methods as in the colonial period and all done by hand.

By the early 20th century, the craft was waning. However, reconstruction after the Mexican Revolution created a demand for tiles and collectors became interested in the work. Large collections were created in the Metropolitan Museum of Art and the Philadelphia Museum of Art. In Mexico, German born Franz Mayer started collection. In 1986, he opened his own museum with the largest collection of Talavera in the world with 726 pieces from the 17th to 19th century.

The Uriarte workshop was founded in 1824, when the family acquired facilities formerly called La Guadalupana. The first owner was Dimas Uriarte. From then until the end of the 19th century, it remained in the family, with production mostly limited to plates and cups, and later some tiles.

In 1897, Catalan artist Enrique Luis Ventosa arrived to Puebla at a time when craft was in danger of disappearing. The Uriarte workshop was one of only six in Puebla. Ventosa worked with this workshop and others to revive the craft with success evident by 1907. In 1910, Uriarte introduced electricity into the workshop, allowing it to produce more and grow, becoming the largest and best known in Puebla.

Starting in 1922, Ventosa began to work with Ysauro Uriarte Martinez, who had just inherited Dimas's workshop. During this time, Ventosa worked on the decoration while Uriarte formed the vessels, with the pieces signed by both men, but by use of decorative initials rather than the standard full signatures. The two men collaborated to elevate the quality of utilitarian pieces and to create unique works of ceramic art introducing pre-Columbian art into the motifs along with the Islamic, Chinese, and Italian influences already present. There was even a touch of Art Nouveau. The two also experimented with some other designs such as a revival of Hispano-Muslim lusterware and firing oxides at different temperatures to change the appearance of the glazes.

By 1923, Uriarte was one of only four workshops to survive the Mexican Revolution.

It continued to be operated by the family until the early 1990s, when it was sold to a group of businessmen. In 1994, the business decided to franchise the name with the first two stores in Cancún and San Diego. During this same time period, Uriarte became one of the first workshops to become eligible for a certificate of authenticity from the government for their Talavera.

== Production ==
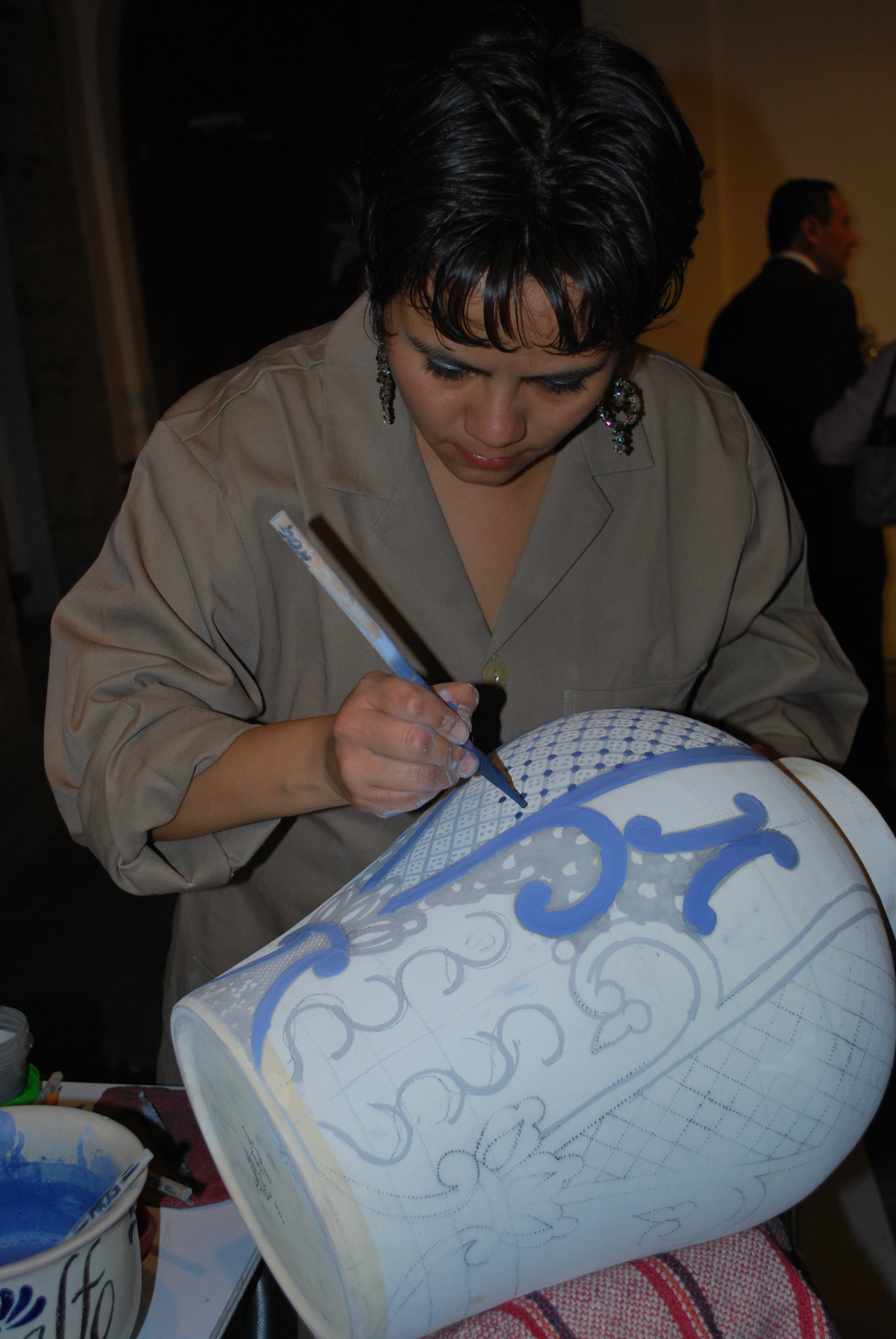
Demonstration of painting a Talavera piece

Uriarte makes about 20,000 pieces a month on average, with about half of the production exported to the United States, France, Italy, Egypt, Australia, Chile and other countries.

Still using 16th century methods, their designs and processes are unique with no two pieces exactly alike as they are made completely by hand, with the process taking up to three months, with about of the cost of each piece being labor. The pieces are registered with a serial number and most pieces are signed by the artisan which creates them.

The workshop has worked with artists such as José Luis Cuevas, Jan Hendrix, Ricardo Regazzoni, Manuel Felguérez and Georgina Farias to create new designs. These designs are part of a collection called "Contemporary Talavera" which is the work of 57 artists which designed 130 pieces. Examples of these works have been displayed in museums in Mexico, the United States and Canada.

== Museum exhibitions ==
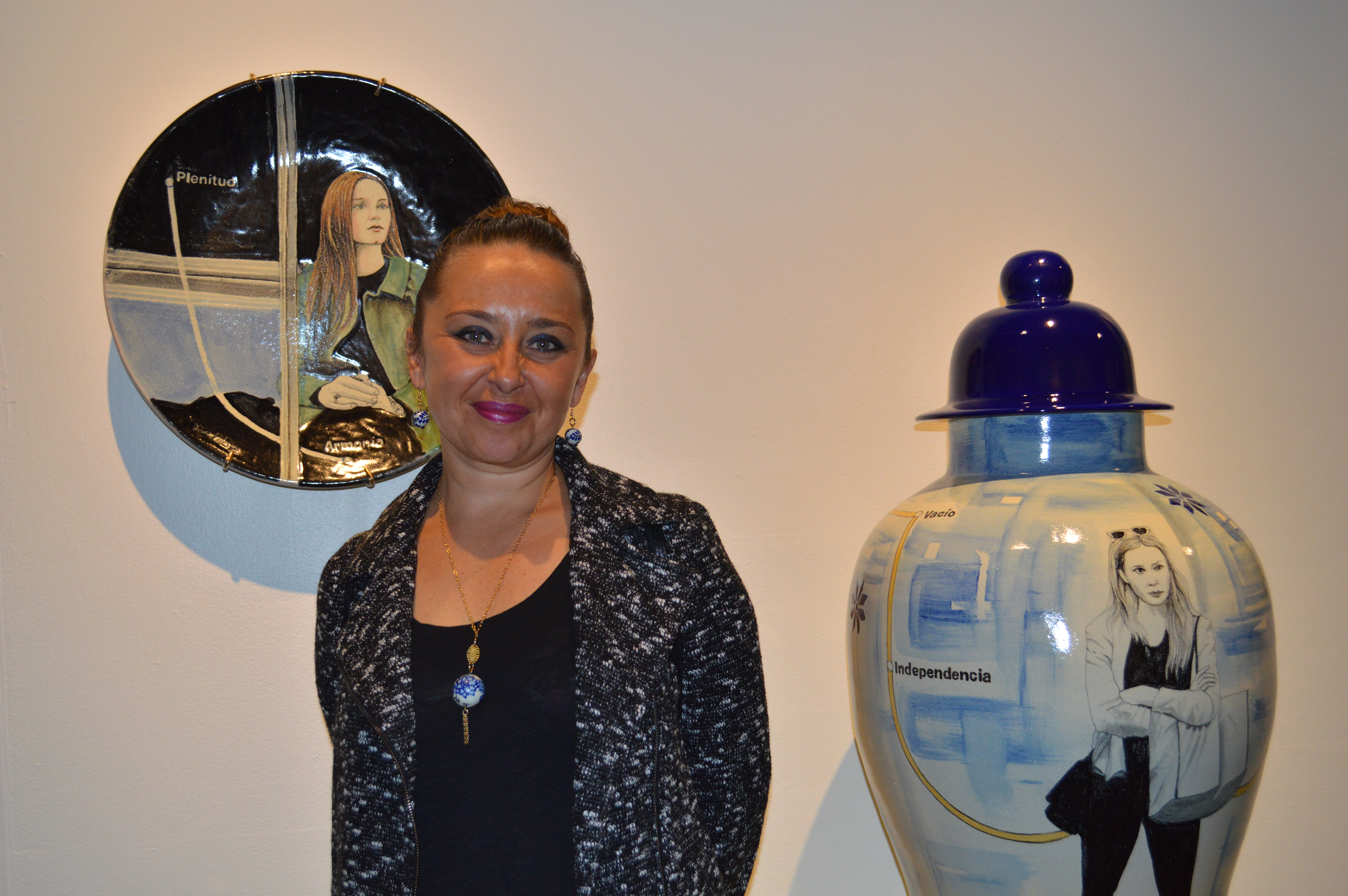
Artist Diana Salazar with ceramic pieces created with the workshop

Pieces from the workshop can be seen in the permanent collections of the Museo José Bello y Gonzalez in Puebla and the Franz Mayer Museum in Mexico City.

In 2012, the workshop, along with the Franz Mayer Museum, sponsored an exhibition called "El cinco de mayo de 1862. Uriarte Talavera Contemporánea" May 5, 1862. Contemporary Uriarte Talavera. It was a project which involved a number of artists along with the enterprise's artisans to create 64 pieces and eleven murals related to the Battle of Puebla to commemorate the battle's 150 anniversary. The artists included Aída Aguilera, Luis Argudín, Silvia Barbescu, Feliciano Béjar, Marna Bunnell, Marcos Castro, Alberto Castro Leñero, Francisco Castro Leñero, Joaquín Conde, Alex Dorfsman, Mónica Dower, Demián Flores, Pedro Friedeberg, Cisco Jiménez, Luis Nishizawa, Maribel Portela and Cristina Rubalcava. The exhibition was shown in Mexico, the United States and Canada.

== See also ==
- List of Mexican artisans
