= List of Art Deco architecture in the Americas =

This is a list of buildings that are examples of Art Deco in the Americas:

== Argentina ==
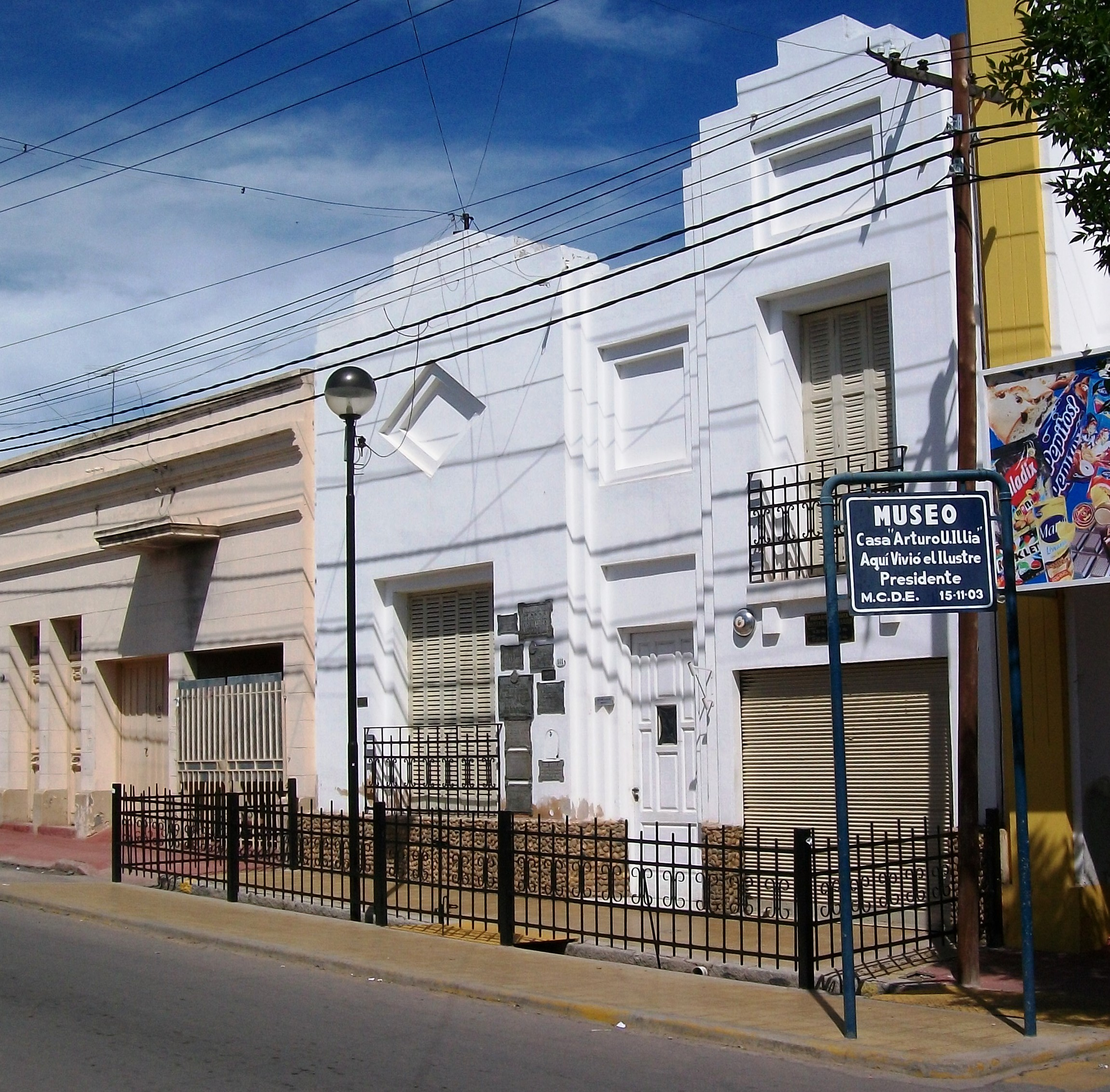
La Casa Museo de Arturo Humberto Illia, Cruz del Eje, Córdoba Province, Buenos Aires

- Palacio Minetti, Santa Fe, 1931
- Cine Parque Belgrano, Santa Fe
- Mercado del Norte, Tucumán

=== Córdoba ===
- Hospital San Roque, 1930
- Casa España, 1935
- Slaughterhouse, 1936
- Municipal Building, 1936
- Casa Museo Arturo Illia, 1944
- Instituto Provincial de Educación Media Nicolás Avellaneda,

=== Buenos Aires, D.F (Capital) ===
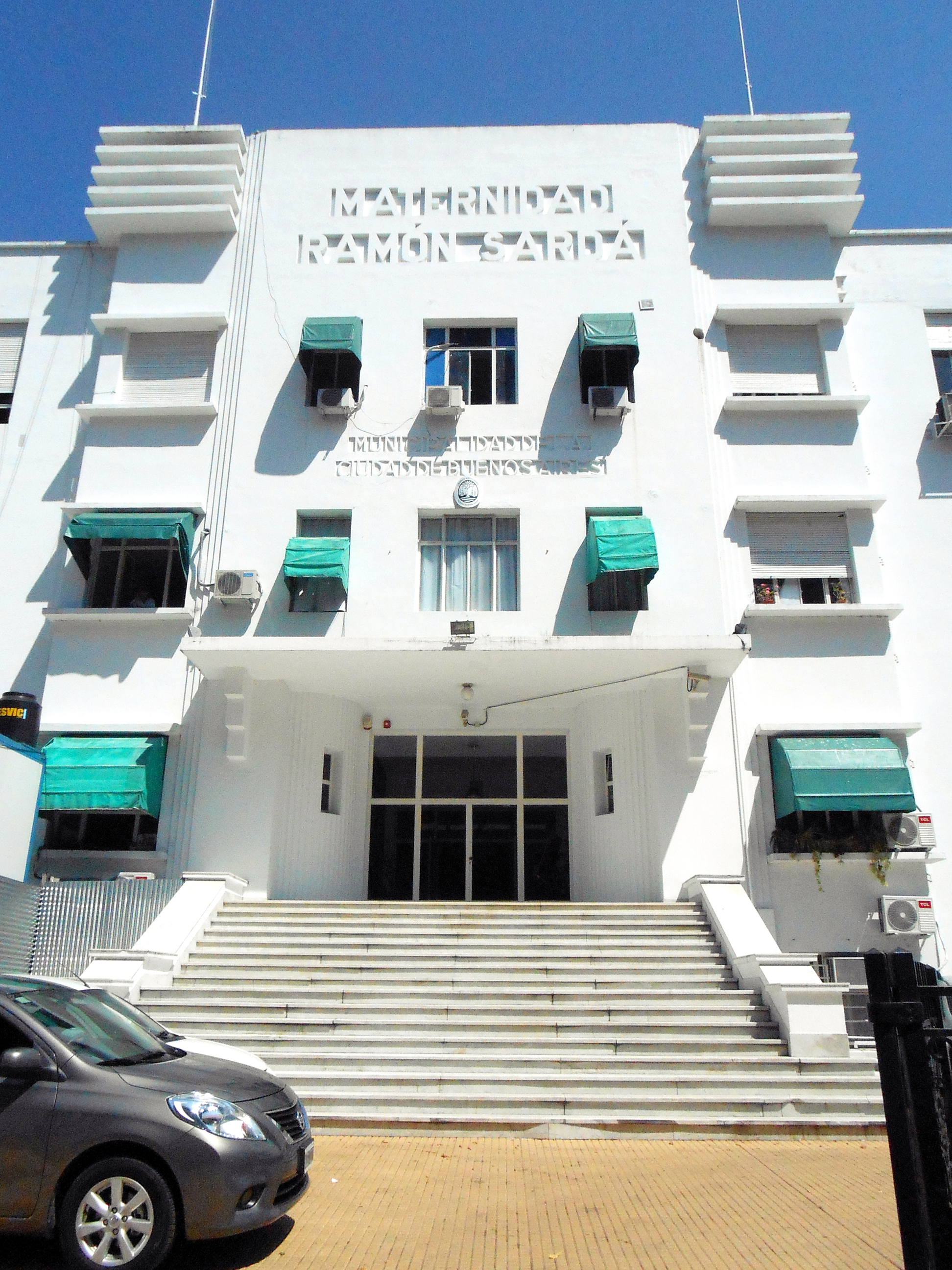
Hospital Maternidad Infantil Ramón Sardá, Buenos Aires, Argentina

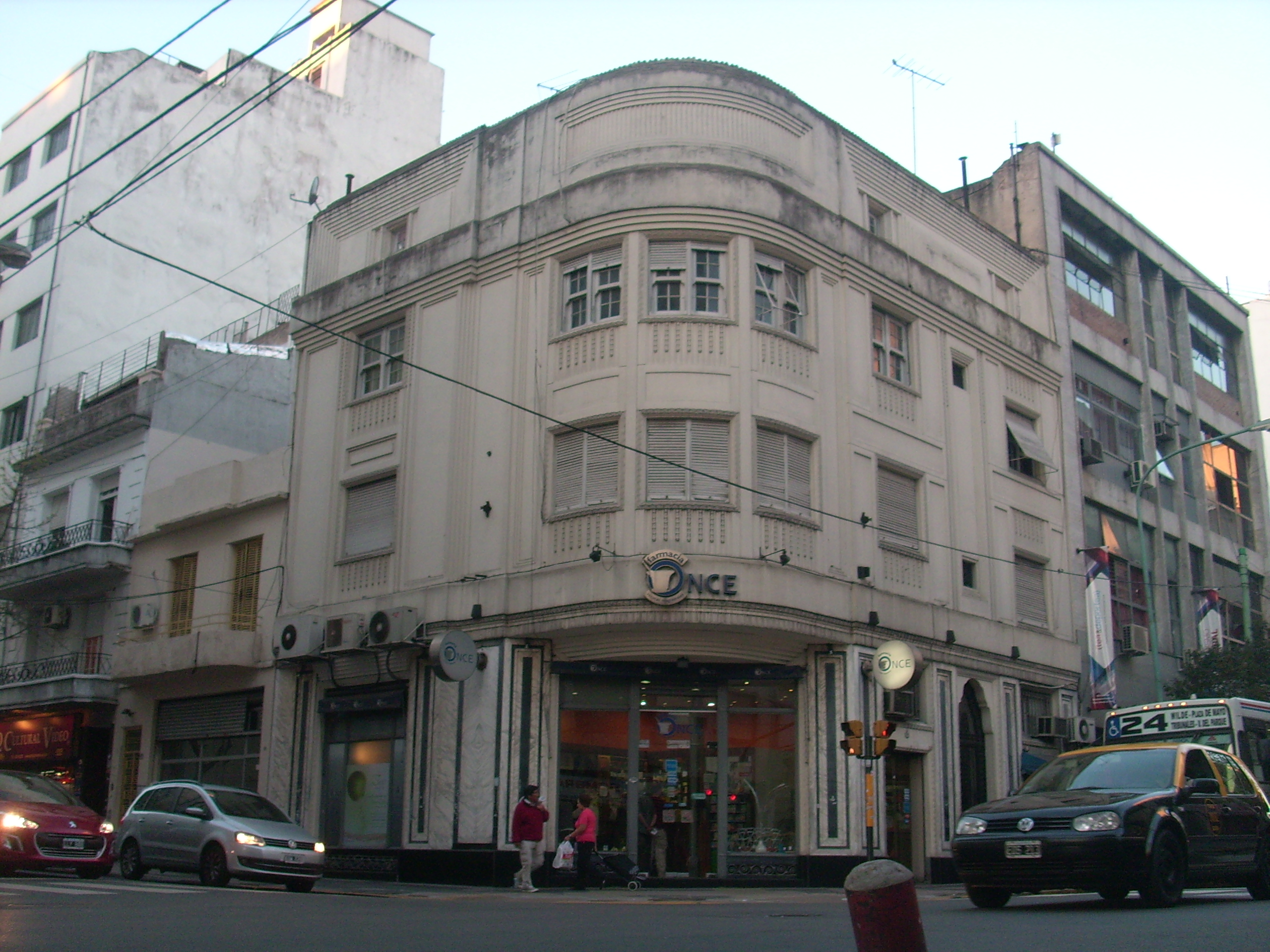
2038 Lavalle, Buenos Aires, Argentina

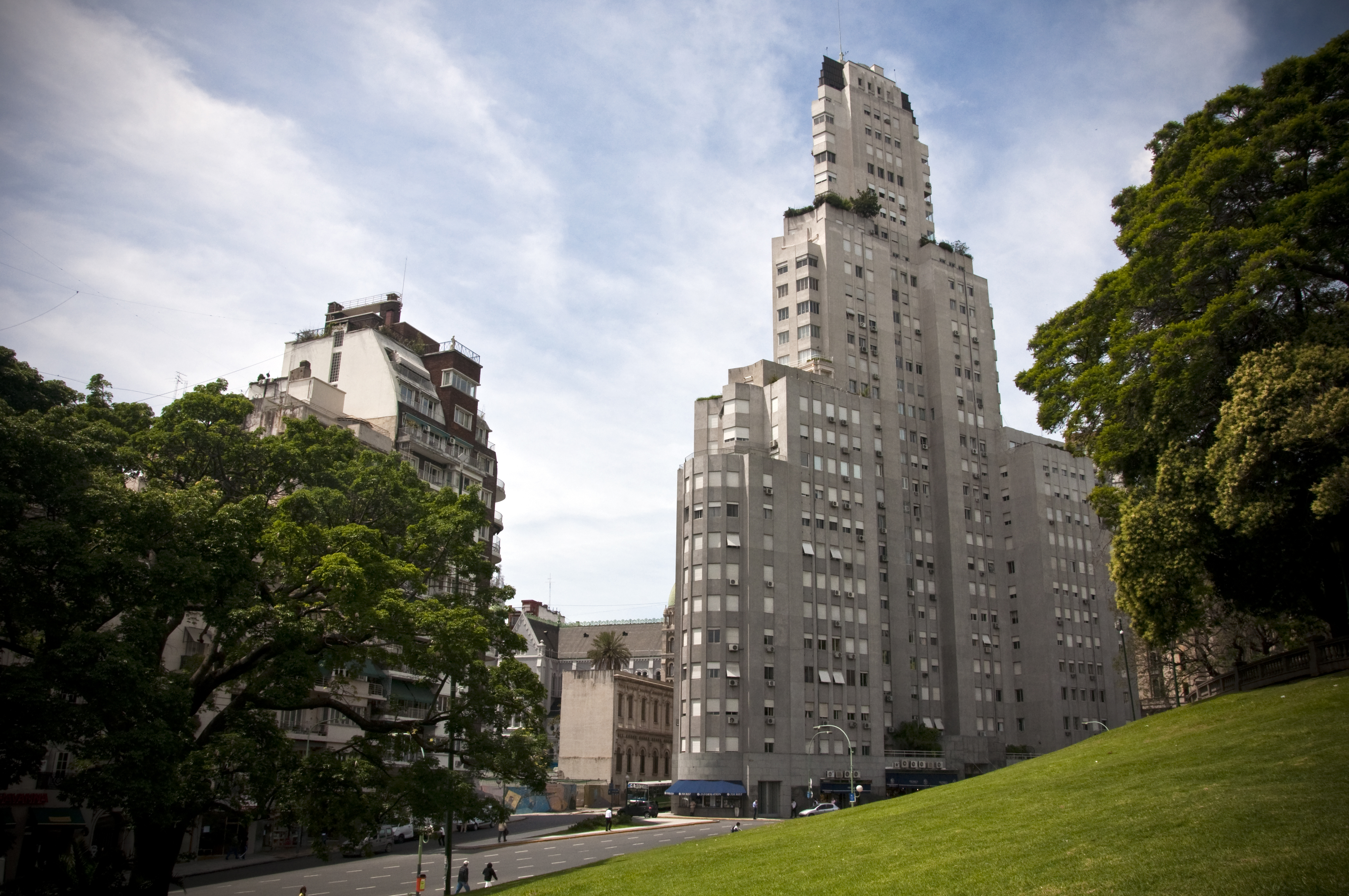
Kavanagh Building, Buenos Aires, Argentina

- Alas Building, 1957
- Argentine Library for the Blind, Lezica branch), 1940s
- Armed Forces Center of Study, 1949
- Banco El Hogar Argentino, 1926
- Banco de la Provincia de Buenos Aires ^{[es]}, 1939
- Casa del Teatro, 1927
- Centro Metropolitano de Diseño ^{[es]}, 1938
- Cine Cosmos, 1929
- Colegio Don Bosco, 1930s
- Colegio Las Esclavas del Sagrado Corazón de Jesús, 1934
- Diario Crítica Building, 1927
- Dorrego Building ^{[es]}, 1936
- Facultad de Medicina ^{[es]}, 1944
- Germanic Bank of South America, 1928
- El Hogar Obrero Cooperative Housing ^{[es]}, 1944
- Estadio Tomás Adolfo Ducó, 1949
- Hospital Británica ^{[es]}, 1942
- Hospital Maternidad Infantil Ramón Sardá ^{[es]}, 1935
- Hotel Moreno, 1929
- Kavanagh Building, 1936
- La Equitatavia del Plata Building ^{[es]}, 1929
- La Unión Building ^{[es]}, 1933
- Lavalle Street, 1923
- Mercado de Abasto ^{[es]}, 1934
- Ministry of Public Works ^{[es]}, 1936
- National City Bank of New York ^{[es]}, 1929
- National Institute of Cinema and Audiovisual Arts, 1946
- NH City & Tower Hotel ^{[es]}, 1931
- San Benito Abbey, 1920
- Shell Mex Building ^{[es]}, 1936
- Teatro Broadway, 1930
- Teatro Empire ^{[es]}, 1934
- Teatro Gran Rex, 1937
- Teatro Gran Rivadavia, 1949
- Teatro Metropolitan ^{[es]}, 1936
- Teatro Ópera, 1936
- Volta Building ^{[es]}, 1935

=== Buenos Aires Province ===
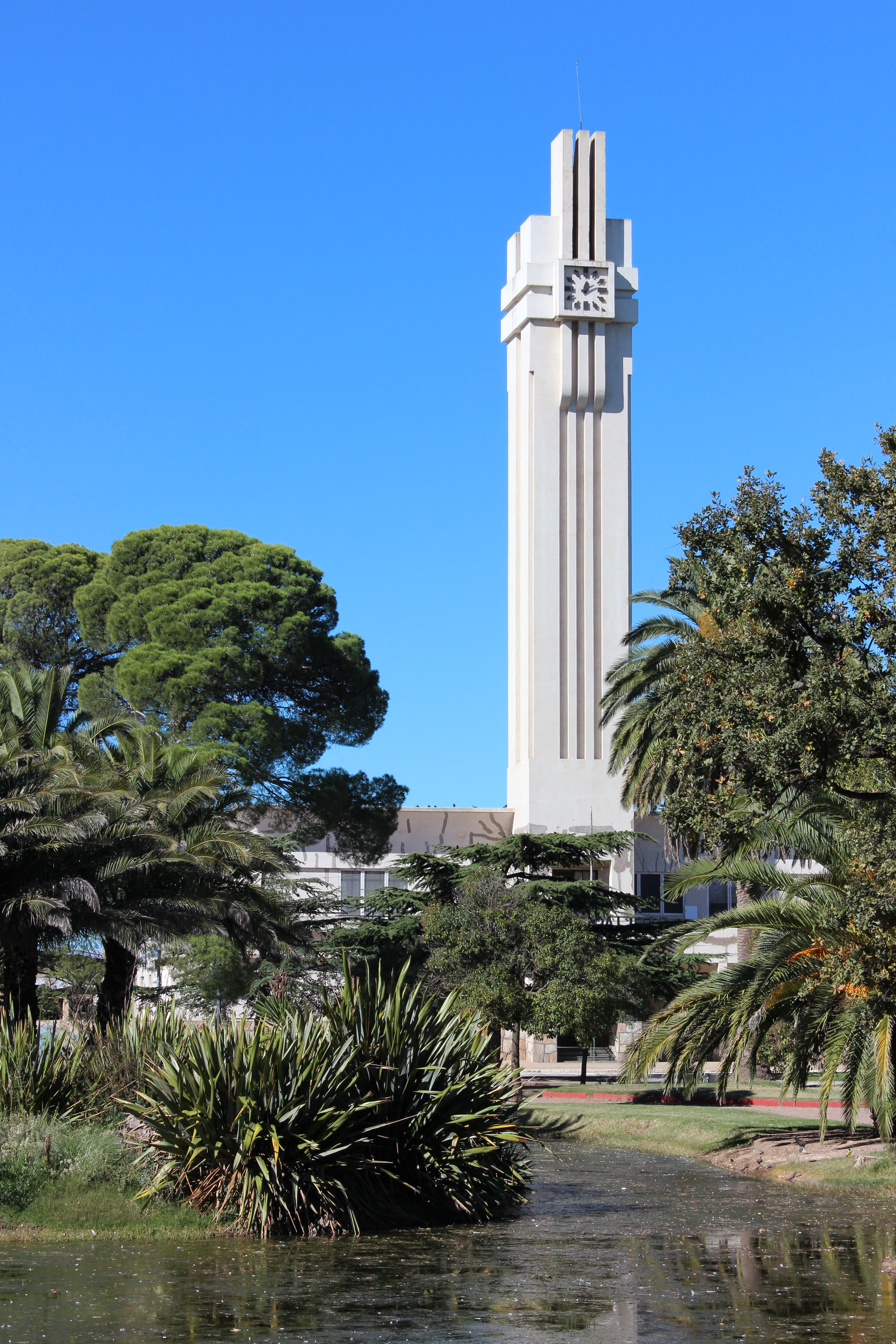
Plaza Ernesto Tornquist and Municipal Building, Tornquist, Buenos Aires Province, Argentina

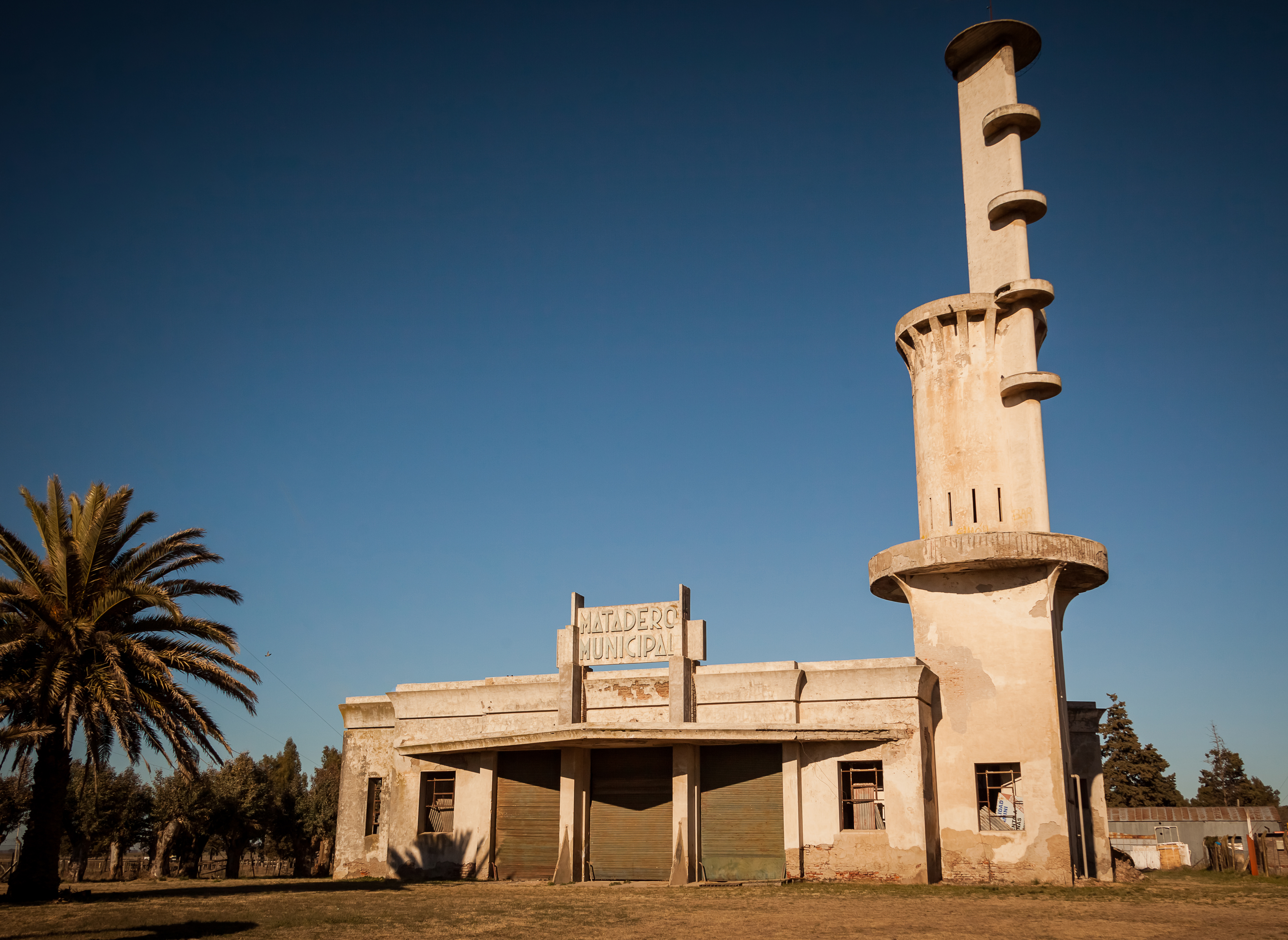
Slaughterhouse, Guaminí, Buenos Aires Province, Argentina

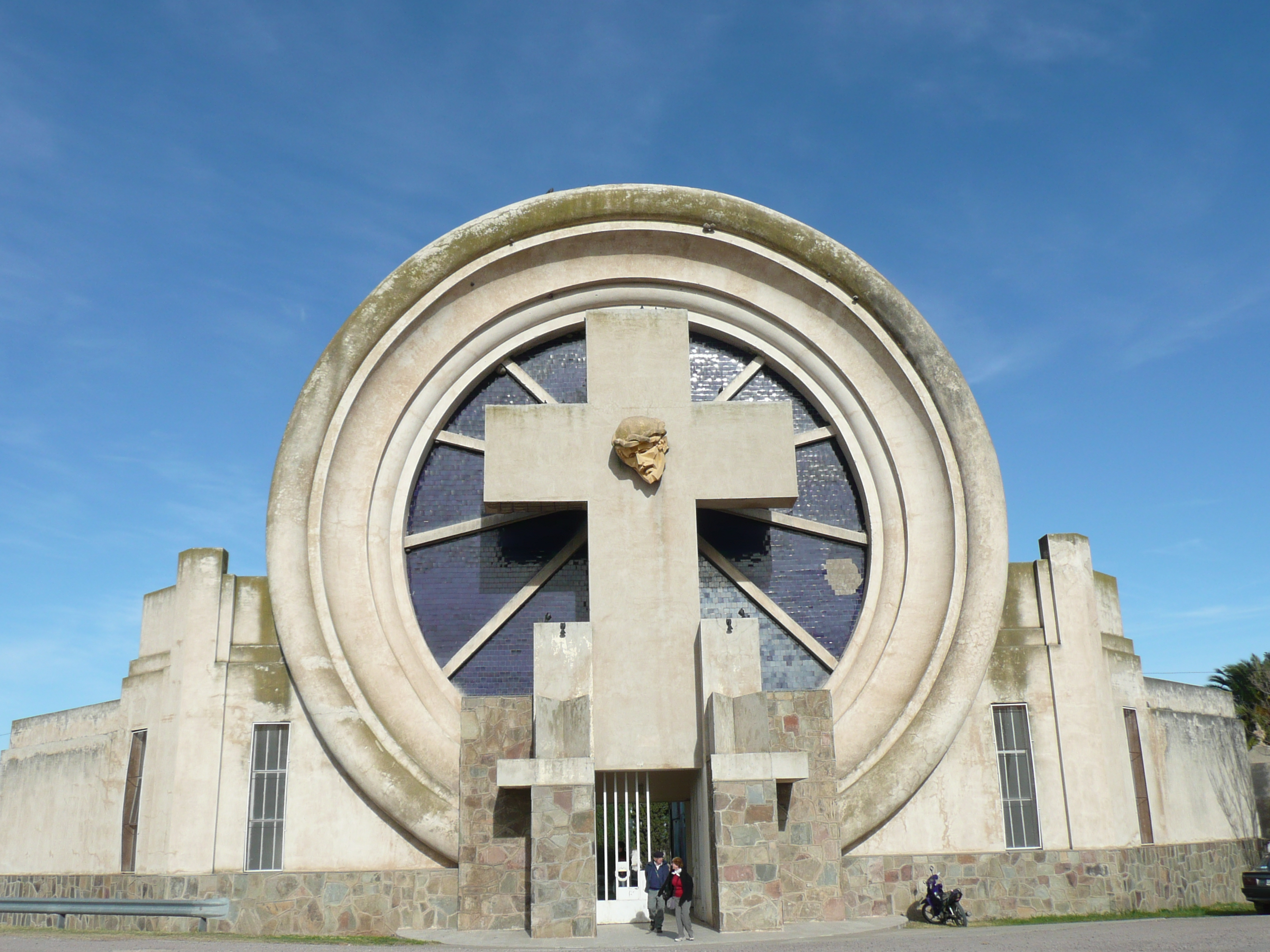
Cemetery, Saldungaray, Buenos Aires Province, Argentina

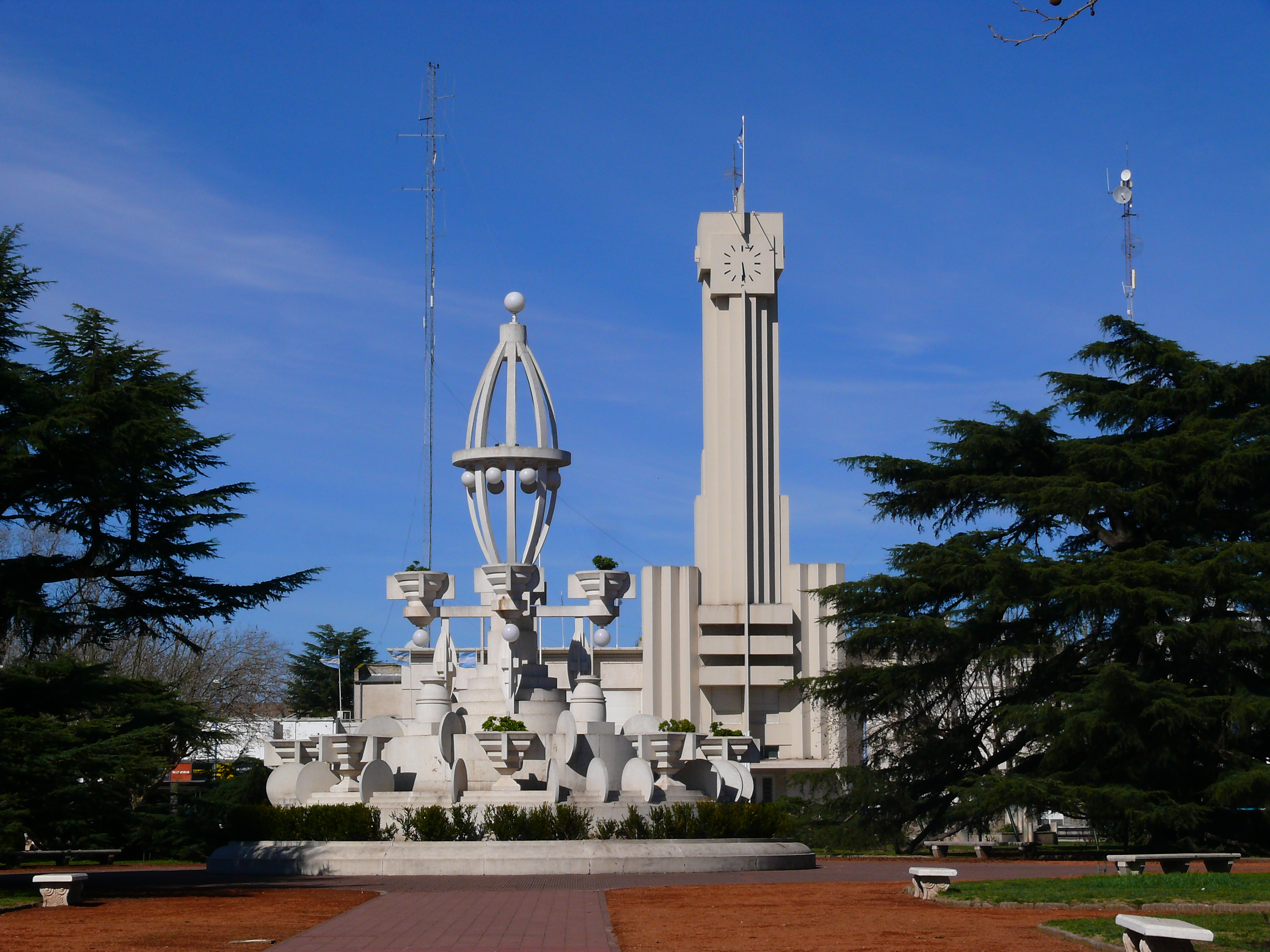
Palacio Municipal, Laprida, Buenos Aires Province, Argentina

- Eustoquio Diaz Vélez Municipal Hospital, Rauch, 1936
- Cemetery, Alberti, Buenos Aires Province
- Cemetery, Balcarce, 1936
- Cemetery, Laprida, 1937
- Cemetery, Saldungaray, 1937
- Domingo Faustuni Sarmiento Municipal Park (gateway), Azul, 1937
- House of Carlos Calegari, Alberti, 1937
- Club Social, Alberti, 1937
- Dr. Manuel B. Cabrera Municipal Hospital, Coronel Pringles, 1937
- Cemetery, Salliqueló, 1938
- Cemetery, Pilar, 1938
- Cemetery, Azul, 1938
- Club Atlético, Pellegrini, 1938
- Danieri House, Azul, 1938
- Escuela Normal Rural, Balcarce, 1938
- El Comercio Building, La Plata, 1938
- Escuela Florentino Ameghino, La Plata, 1938
- Municipal Building, Chascomús, 1937
- Municipal Building, Guaminí, 1937
- Municipal Building, Laprida, 1937
- Municipal Building, Pellegrini, 1937
- Municipal Building, Rauch, 1937
- Municipal Building, Tornquist, 1937
- Municipal Building of Adolfo Alsina, Carhué, 1938
- Municipal Building of Alberti, Alberti, 1938
- Municipal Building Leandro N. Alem, Vedia, 1938
- Municipal Building, Lomas de Zamora, 1938
- Municipal Building, Coronel Pringles, 1940
- Municipal Delegation, Cuartel VII, 1936
- Municipal Delegation, Alberdi, 1937
- Municipal Delegation, Alem, 1937
- Municipal Delegation, Bonifacio, 1937
- Municipal Delegation, Casabas, 1937
- Municipal Delegation of Coronel Mom, Coronel Mom, 1937
- Municipal Delegation of Chillar, 1937
- Municipal Delegation, El Dorado, 1937
- Municipal Delegation, Garré, 1937
- Municipal Delegation, San Agustín, 1937
- Municipal Delegation, San Jorge, 1937
- Municipal Delegation, Tres Picos, 1937
- Municipal Delegation de Escobar, Belén de Escobar, 1938
- Municipal Delegation, Miranda, 1938
- Municipal Delegation, Saldungaray, 1938
- Municipal Delegation, Tres Lomas, 1938
- Municipal Market, Saldungaray, 1937
- Plaza General José de San Martín, Pellegrini, 1937
- Slaughterhouse, Alem, 1937
- Slaughterhouse, Balcarce, 1937
- Slaughterhouse, Coronel Pringles, 1937
- Slaughterhouse, Guaminí, 1937
- Slaughterhouse, Saldungaray, 1937
- Slaughterhouse, Tornquist, 1937
- Slaughterhouse, Vedia, 1937
- Slaughterhouse, Cachari, 1937
- Slaughterhouse, Chillar, 1937
- Slaughterhouse, Villa Epecuén, 1937
- Slaughterhouse, Adolfo Gonzales, 1938
- Slaughterhouse, Azul, 1938
- Slaughterhouse, Tres Lomas, 1938
- Slaughterhouse, Salliqueló, 1938
- Slaughterhouse, Pellegrini, 1938
- Slaughterhouse, Pellegrini, 1938
- Plaza Juan Pascual Pringles, Colonel Pringles, 1939
- Mercado Municipal, Adolfo Gonzales Chaves, 1939
- Municipal Building of Adolfo Gonzales Chaves, Adolfo Gonzales Chaves, 1939
- Colegio Michael Ham, Vicente López, 1951
- Emilio Canzani House, Mar del Pata, 1954

== The Bahamas ==
- Bahama Craft Centre, Nassau
- Wyndham Nassau Resort, Nassau, Bahamas

== Barbados ==
- SoCo Hotel, Bridgetown, Barbados
- Pirate's Inn, Christ Church, Barbados

== Belize ==
- Princess Cinema, Belize City, 1950s
- Wesley Methodist Church, Belize City, 1951

== Bolivia ==
- 6259 La Plata, Oruro
- Autoridad de Supervisión del Sistema Financiero, Oruro
- Banco Nacional de Bolivia, Oruro
- Building at 17 Arenales, former house of Virreira family, Sucre
- Building at 48 Calvo, Sucre
- Carrera de Enfermería, Sucre
- Casa Commercial Schütt, Sucre
- Cine Gran Rex, Oruro
- Escuela Nacional de Maestros "Mariscal Sucre," Sucre
- Estación Presidente Aniceto Arce Train Station, Sucre, 1940
- Fiscalía General del Estado (formerly Banco Central de Bolivia), Sucre
- Tribunal Constitucional Plurinacional (Plurinational Constitutional Court), Sucre

=== Cochabamba ===
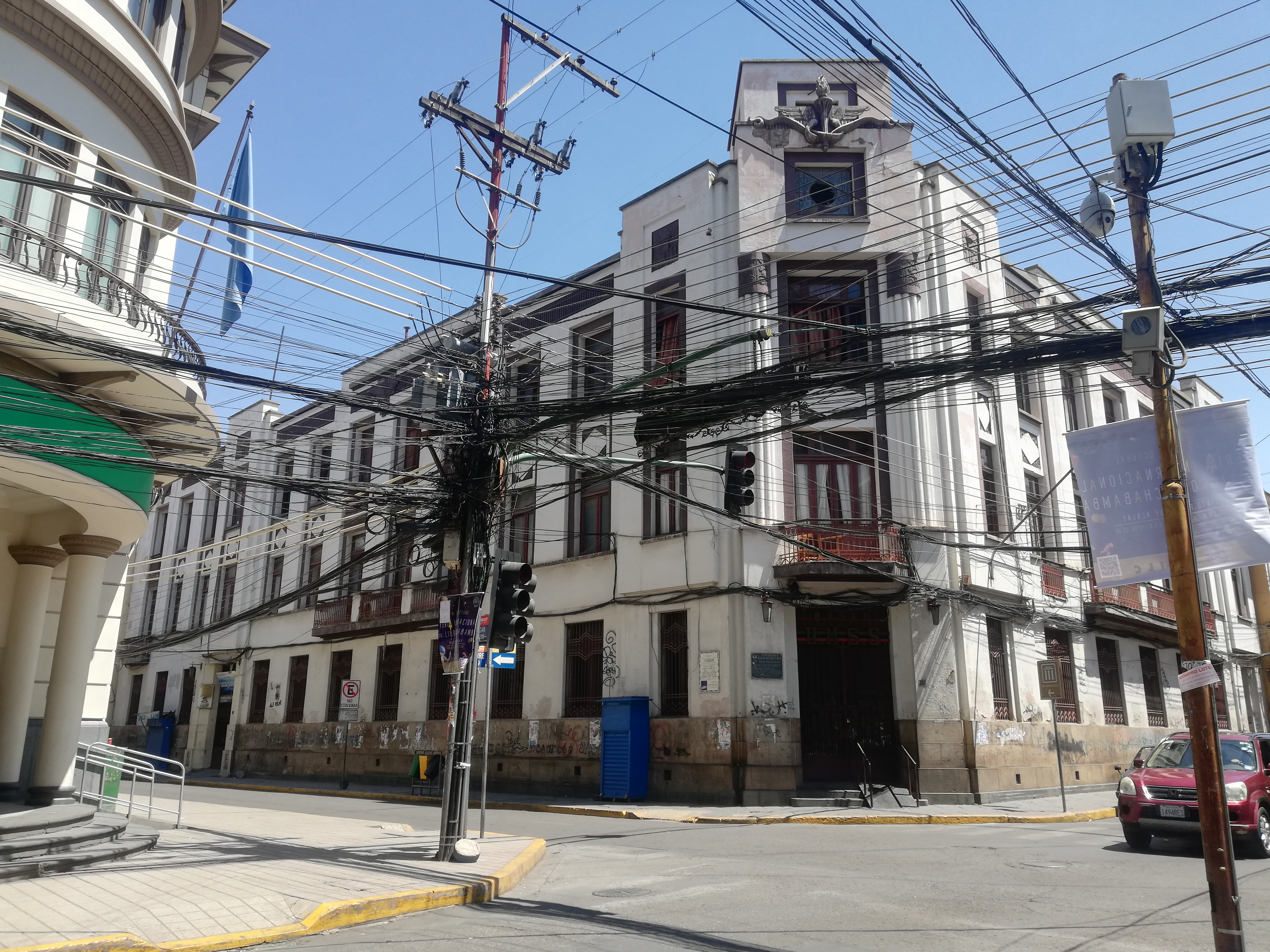
Instituto de Investigaciones Antropológicas y Museo Arqueológico (former Central Bank of Bolivia), Cochabamba, Bolivia

- Cine Roxy, Cochabamba
- former Cine Victor, Cochabamba
- Colegio La Salle, Cochabamba
- Edificio Comité Cívico de Cochabamba, Cochabamba
- Escuela Militar de Sargentos del Ejército, Cochabamba
- Estadio Félix Capriles, Cochabamba, 1938

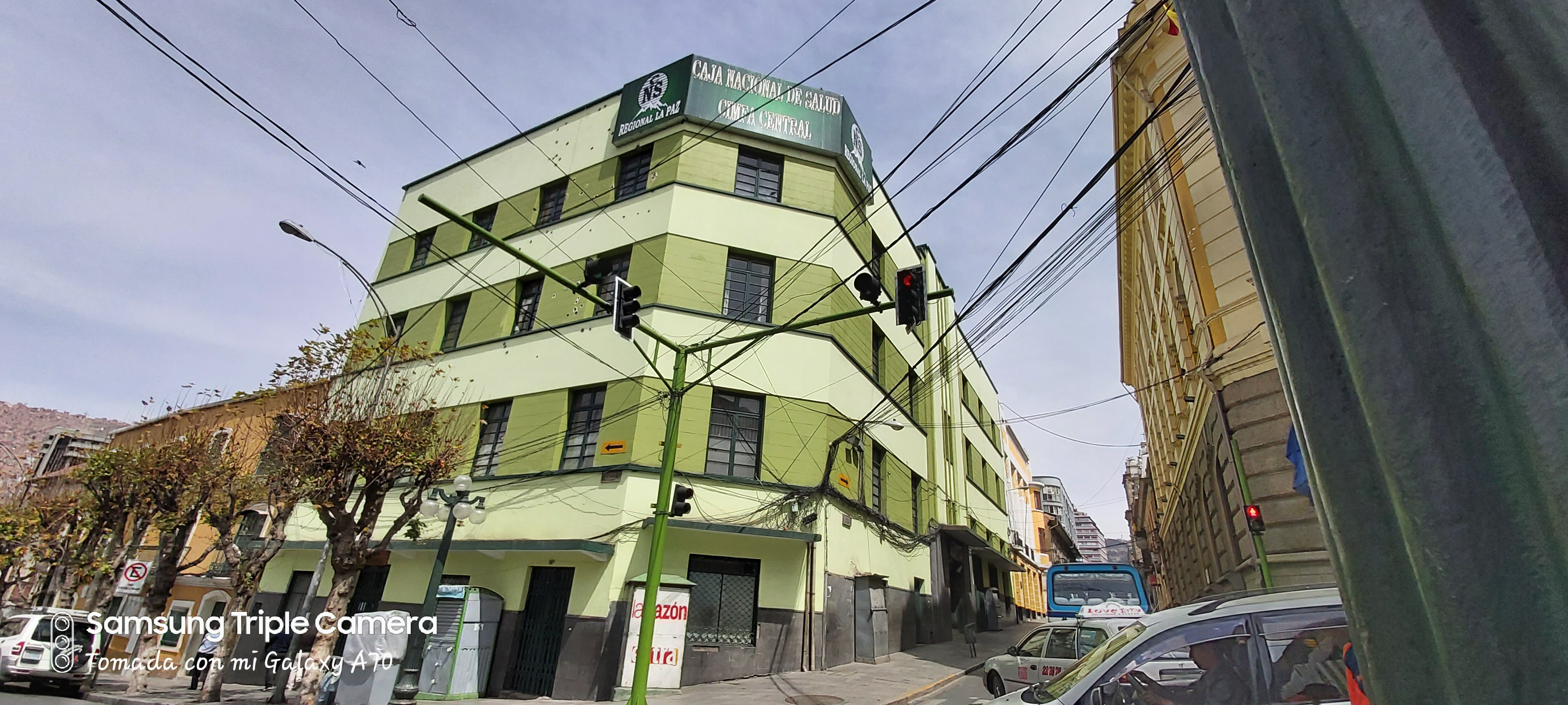
Caja Nacional de Salad, La Paz, Bolivia

- Instituto de Investigaciones Antropológicas y Museo Arqueológico (former Central Bank of Bolivia), Cochabamba, 1951
- Iglesia de San Pedro, Cochabamba, 1961

=== La Paz ===
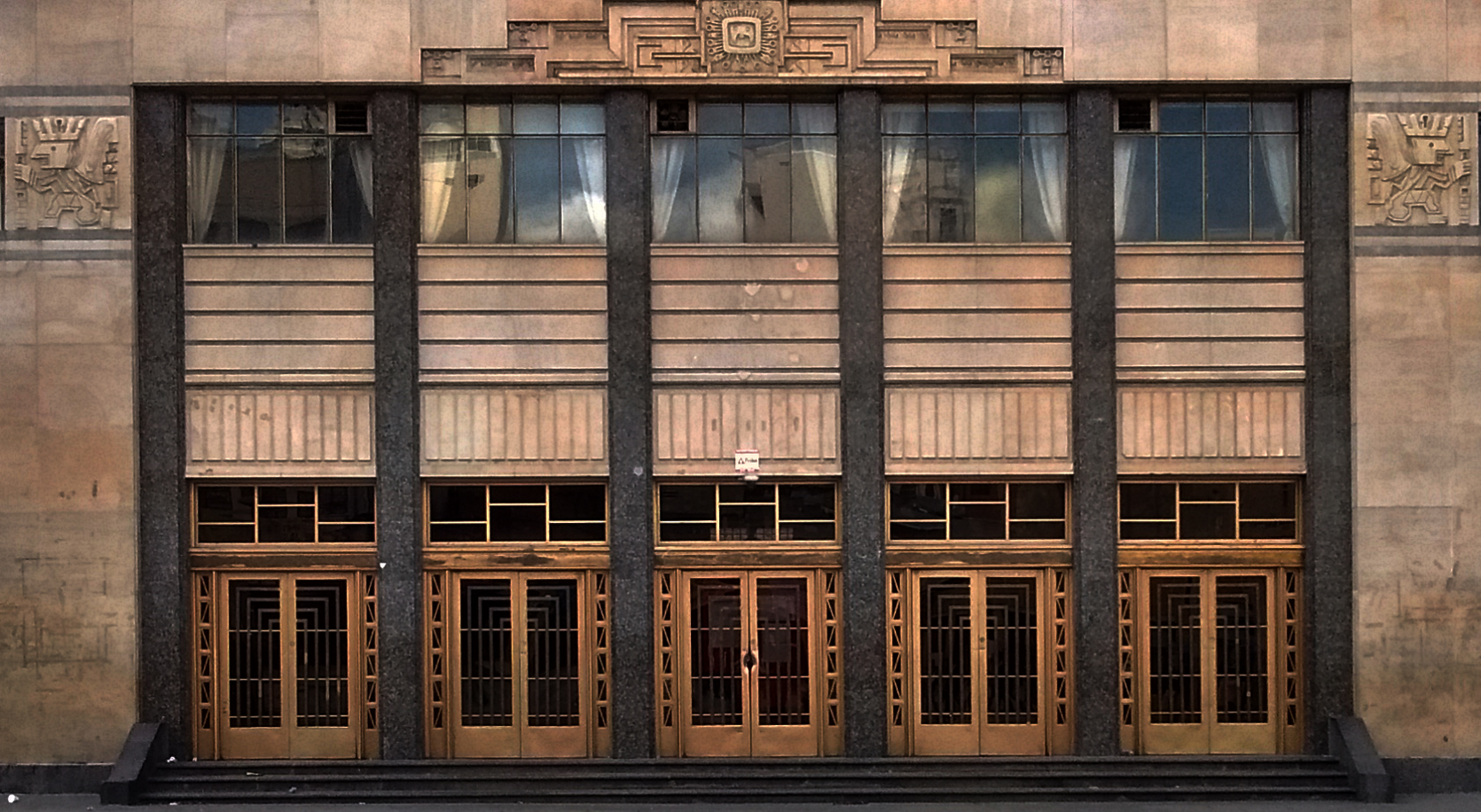
Entrance of the Higher University of San Andrés, La Paz, Bolivia

- Avenida Argentina 1986, 1992, and 1994 La Paz
- Avenida Camacho 1209, 1389 and 1415, La Paz
- Avenida Mariscal Santa Cruz 1308 and 1311, La Paz
- Banco Bisa Agencia Camacho, Av. Camacho, La Paz
- Basílica María Auxiliador, La Paz, 1946
- La Biblioteca Municipal de La Paz, La Paz, 1938
- Caja Nacional de Salud (National Health Fund), La Paz
- Calle C. R. Villalobos 1497, La Paz
- Cine Teatro Monje Campero, La Paz
- Club de la Paz, Av. Camacho, La Paz, 1942
- Edificio Krsul, Fondo Nacional de Inversión Productiva y Social offices, Av. Camacho, La Paz
- Edificio Luz de Alba, La Paz
- Eros Karaoke Club, La Paz
- Hotel Sagarnaga, La Paz
- Laboratorios Vita, La Paz
- Ministerio de Defensa, La Paz
- Ministerio de Desarrollo Productivo y Economía Plural, Av. Camacho, La Paz
- Ministerio de Desarollo Rural Y Tierras, Av. Camacho, La Paz
- Ministerio de Gobierno, Dirección General de Migración, Av. Camacho, La Paz
- Ministerio de Salud, La Paz
- Monoblock Building, Universidad Mayor de San Andrés, La Paz, 1947

== Brazil ==
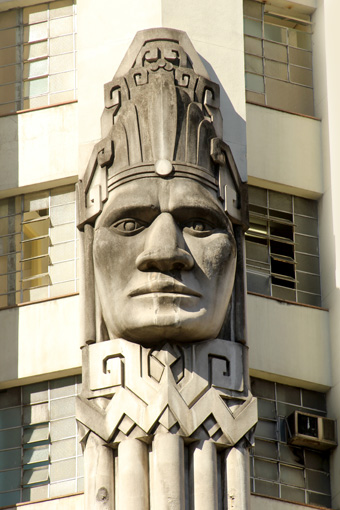
Edificio Aciaca, Belo Horizonte, Brazil

- Cinema Olympia, Belém, 1912
- Lacerda Elevator, Salvador, Bahia, 1930
- Colégio Sévigné, Porto Alegre, Rio Grande do Sul, 1930
- Cine Theatro Brasil, Belo Horizonte, Minas Gerais, 1932
- Prefeitura de Belo Horizonte, Belo Horizonte, Minas Gerais, 1935
- Instituto do Cacau, Salvador, Bahia, 1936
- Relógio Central, Três Lagoas, Mato Grosso do Sul, 1936
- Igreja de São Geraldo, Porto Alegre, Rio Grande do Sul, 1938
- Biblioteca Municipal Félix Araújo, Campina Grande, Paraíba, 1942
- Edifício Acaiaca, Belo Horizonte, 1943
- Casa do Baile, Pampulha, Belo Horizonte, 1943
- Santa Casa De Misericórdia, Belo Horizonte, Minas Gerais, 1946
- Edificio Sulacap, Salvador, Bahia, 1946

=== Goiânia, Goiás ===
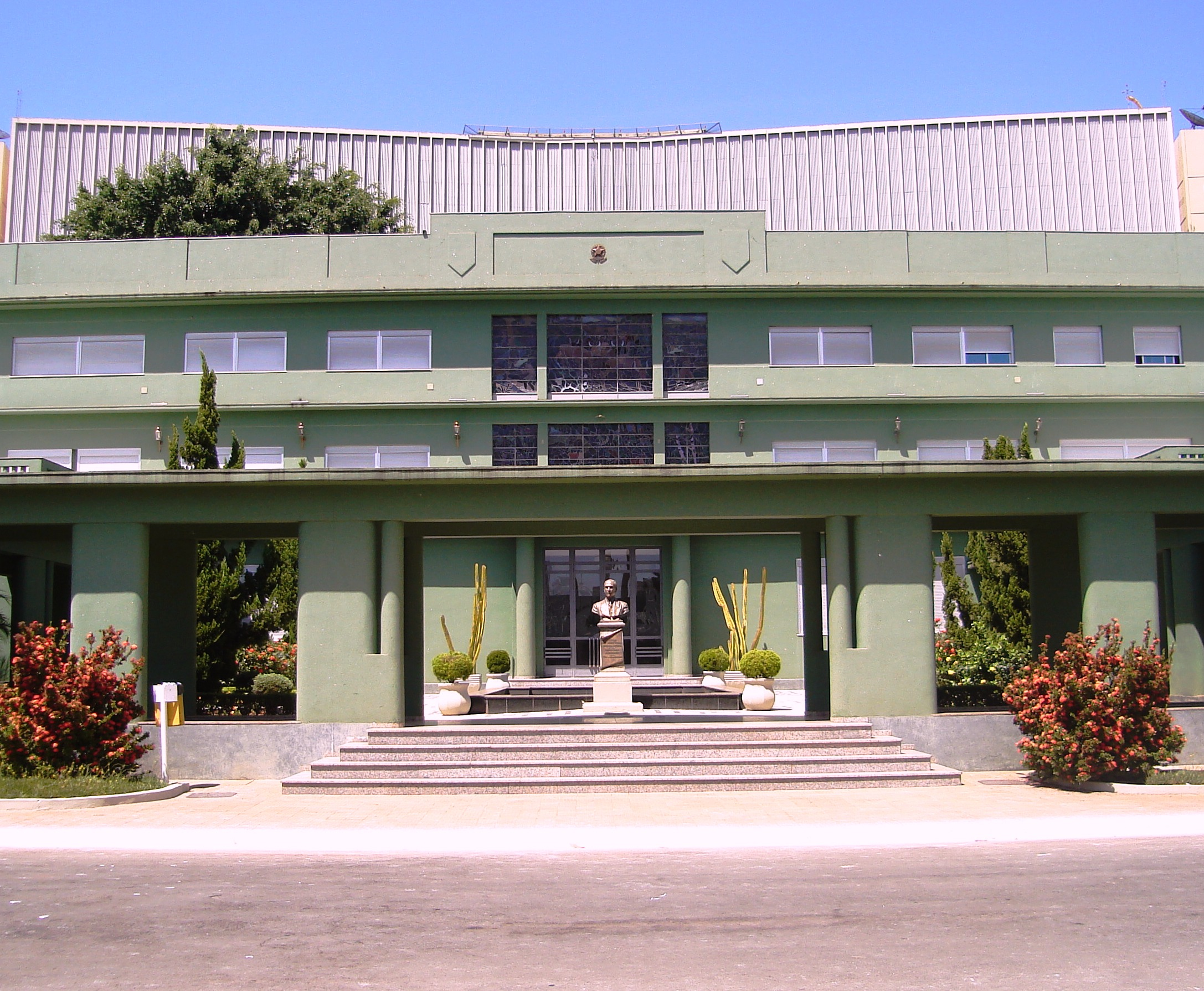
Palácio das Esmeraldas, Goiás, Goiânia, Brazil

- Grande Hotel de Goiânia, Goiânia, 1935
- Cine Teatro Estrela, Goiânia, 1936
- Esmeraldas Palace, Attilio Corrêa Lima, Goiânia, 1937
- Coreto da Praça Cívica, Goiânia, 1942
- Goiânia Theatre, Jorge Félix de Souza, Goiânia, 1942
- Museu Estadual Professor Zoroastro Artiaga, Goiânia, 1946
- Estação Ferroviária, Geraldo Duarte Passos, Goiânia, 1952

=== Rio de Janeiro ===
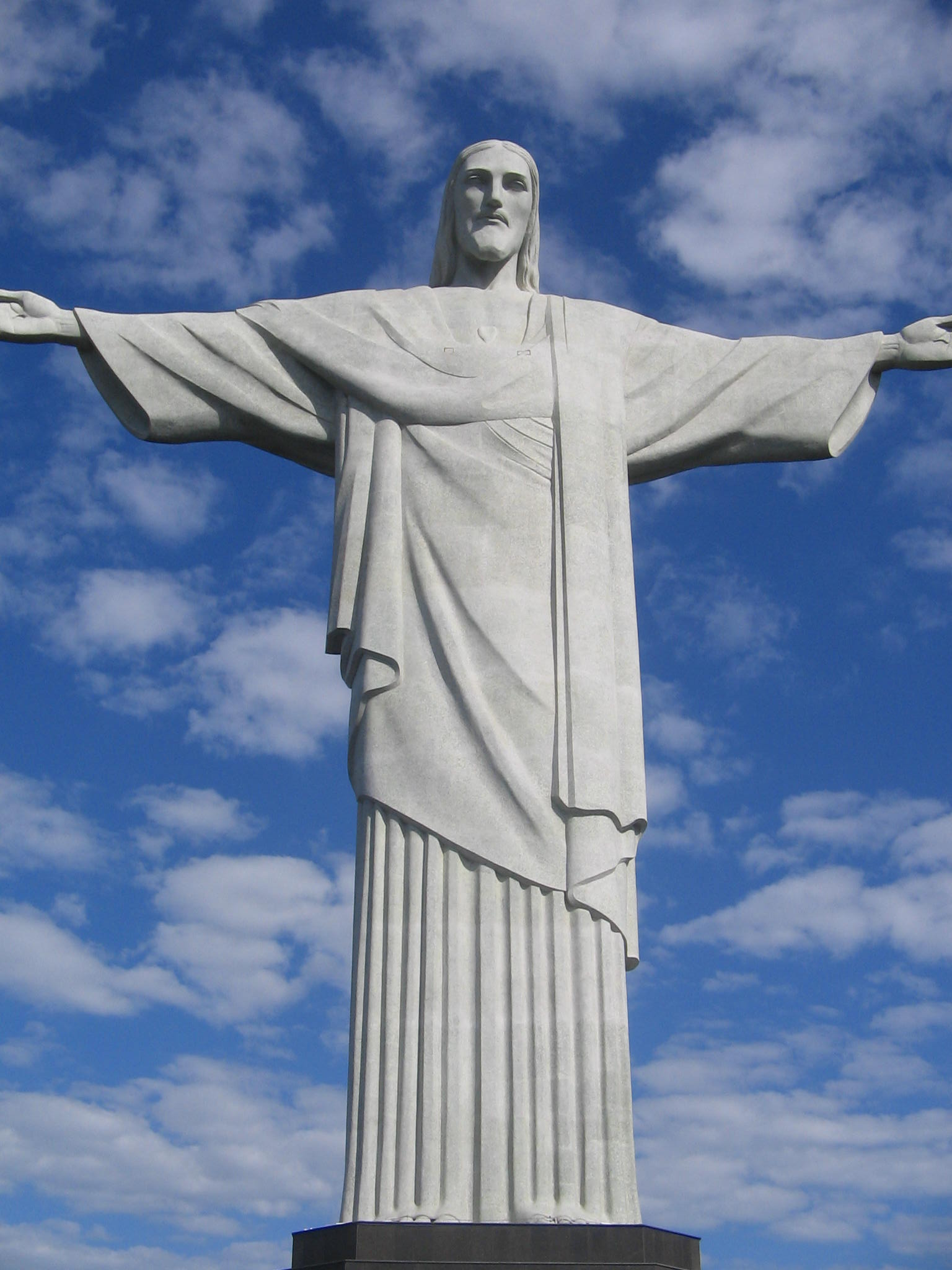
Christ the Redeemer/Cristo Redentor, Rio de Janeiro, Brazil

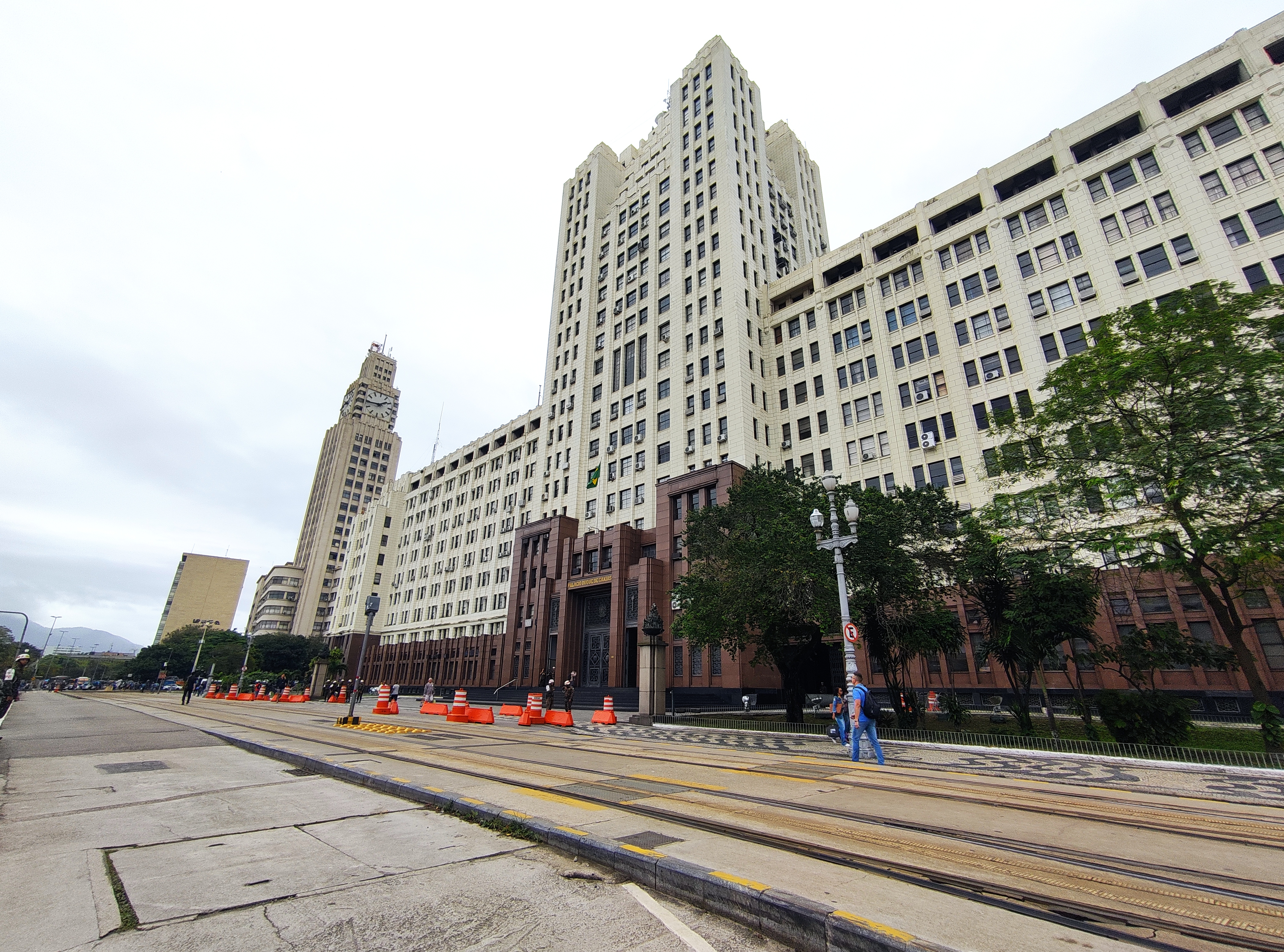
Palácio Duque de Caxias, Rio de Janeiro, Brazil

- Bar Luiz, Rio de Janeiro, 1927
- Cine Pathé, Rio de Janeiro, 1927
- Estádio São Januário, Rio de Janeiro, 1927
- Edificio Itaoca, Copababana, Rio de Janeiro, 1928
- A Noite Building, Rio de Janeiro, 1929
- Edifício Ypiranga, Rio de Janeiro, 1930
- Christ the Redeemer statue, Paul Landowski, 1931
- Edificio Guahy, Copacabana, Rio de Janeiro, 1932
- Edificio Itahy, Rio de Janeiro, 1932
- Cine Rex, Rio de Janeiro, 1933
- Edificio Mesbia, Rio de Janeiro, 1934
- Edifício Embaixador, Rio de Janeiro, 1935
- Edificio Alagoas, Copacabana, Rio de Janeiro, 1935
- Edifício Caxias, Rio de Janeiro, 1937
- Cine Rosário, Ramos Rio de Janeiro, 1938
- Cine Roxy, Rio de Janeiro, 1938
- Associação Comercial do Rio de Janeiro Building, Rio de Janeiro, 1939
- Central do Brasil station, Rio de Janeiro, 1943
- Cine Cachambi, Cachambi, Rio de Janeiro, 1950
- Cine Irajá, Irajá, Rio de Janeiro, 1941
- Cine Vaz Lobo, Vaz Lobo, Rio de Janeiro, 1941
- Edificio Amazonas, Copacabana, Rio de Janeiro
- Edificio Ceará, Copacabana, Rio de Janeiro
- Edifícios Comodoro, Solano e Ouro Preto, Rio de Janeiro
- Edificio Fabiao, Copacabana, Rio de Janeiro
- Edifício Joseph Gire (Edificio a Noite), Rio de Janeiro, 1929
- Edifício Mayapán, Rio de Janeiro, 1940
- Edificio Ophir, Copacabana, Rio de Janeiro
- Edificio Petronio, Copacabana, Rio de Janeiro
- Edificio Sylvia, Copacabana, Rio de Janeiro
- Estação Ferroviária de Realengo railway station, Realengo, Rio de Janeiro
- Igreja de Santa Terezinha (St. Teresa Church), Rio de Janeiro
- Monumento Rodoviário da Rodovia Presidente Dutra, Rio de Janeiro, 1938
- Monumento ao Senador Pinheiro Machado, Rio de Janeiro, 1931
- Palacete São João do Rei, Flamengo, Rio de Janeiro, 1933
- Palácio Duque de Caxias, Christiano Stockler das Neves, Rio de Janeiro, 1942
- Palacio da Fazenda, Rio de Janeiro, 1928
- Santuário Nacional de Nossa Senhora da Conceição Aparecida, Aparecida, Rio de Janeiro, 1946
- Teatro Carlos Gomes, Rio de Janeiro, 1931
- Teatro Dulcina & Cine Orly, Rio de Janeiro, 1935
- Teatro Rival, Rio de Janeiro, 1934
- Tribunal Regional do Trabalho (Regional Labor Courts), Rio de Janeiro, 1936

=== São Paulo ===
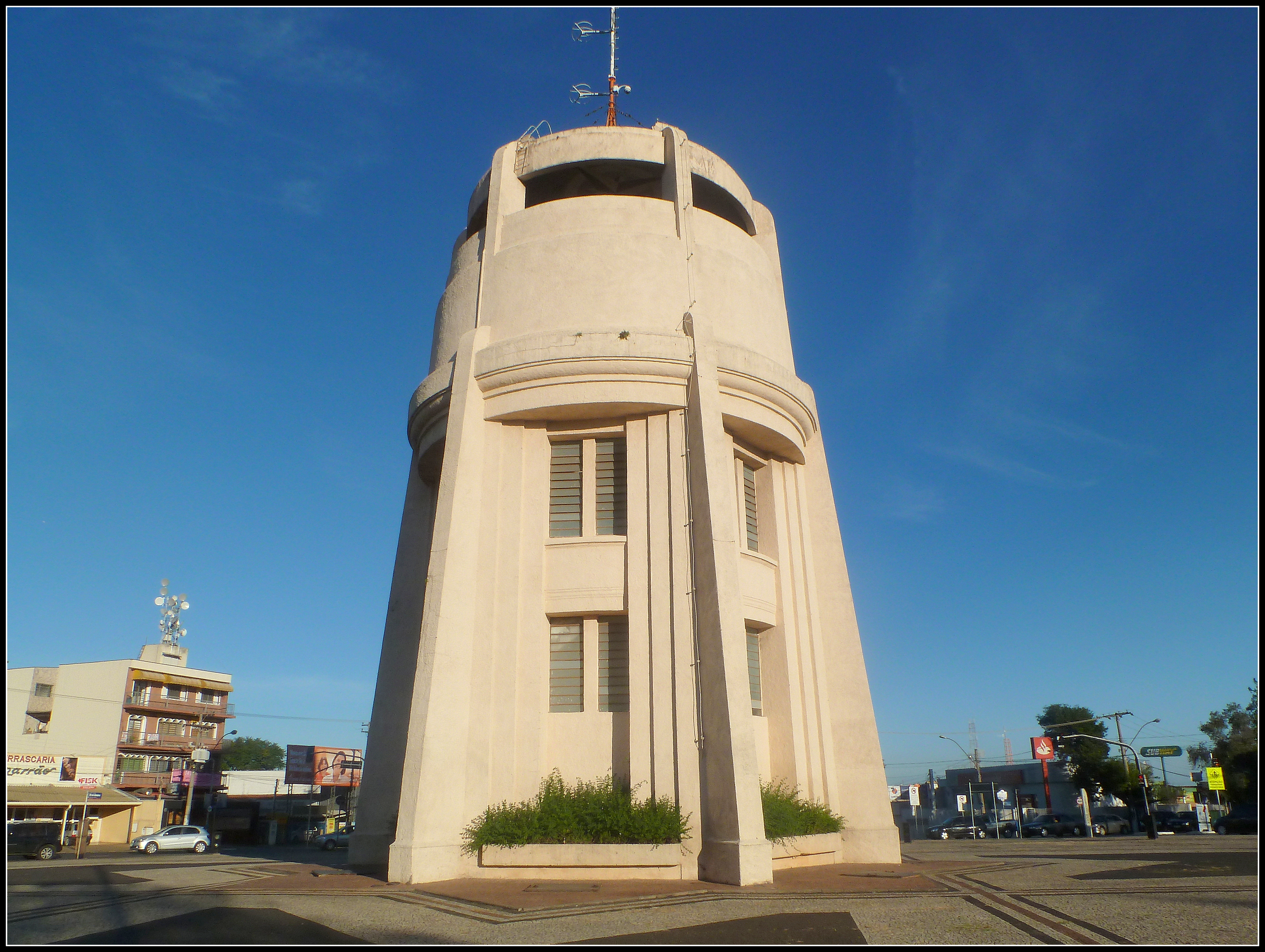
Torre do Castelo, Campinas, São Paulo, Brazil

- Altino Arantes Building, São Paulo, 1947
- B3 Bolsa de Valores/Palácio do Café, São Paulo, 1934
- Banco de São Paulo Building, São Paulo, 1938
- Cine Marabá, São Paulo, 1944
- Edifício do Banco do Brasil, São Paulo, 1954
- Edifício Elizabeth, São Paulo, 1938
- Edifício João Brícola, São Paulo
- Edifício Saldanha Marinho, São Paulo, 1930
- Edifício Santa Victoria, São Paulo, 1930s
- Espacio Unibanco de Cinema, São Paulo, 1947
- Estádio Municipal Paulo Machado de Carvalho (Pacaembu Stadium), São Paulo, 1940
- Biological Institute, Mario Whately, São Paulo, 1928
- Mário de Andrade Library, São Paulo, 1942
- Monumento às Bandeiras, Victor Brecheret, São Paulo, 1954
- Pacaembu Stadium, São Paulo, 1940
- Teatro Santana, São Paulo, 1960
- Torre do Castelo, Campinas, São Paulo, 1940
- Viaduto do Chá (Tea viaduct), São Paulo, 1938

== Canada ==
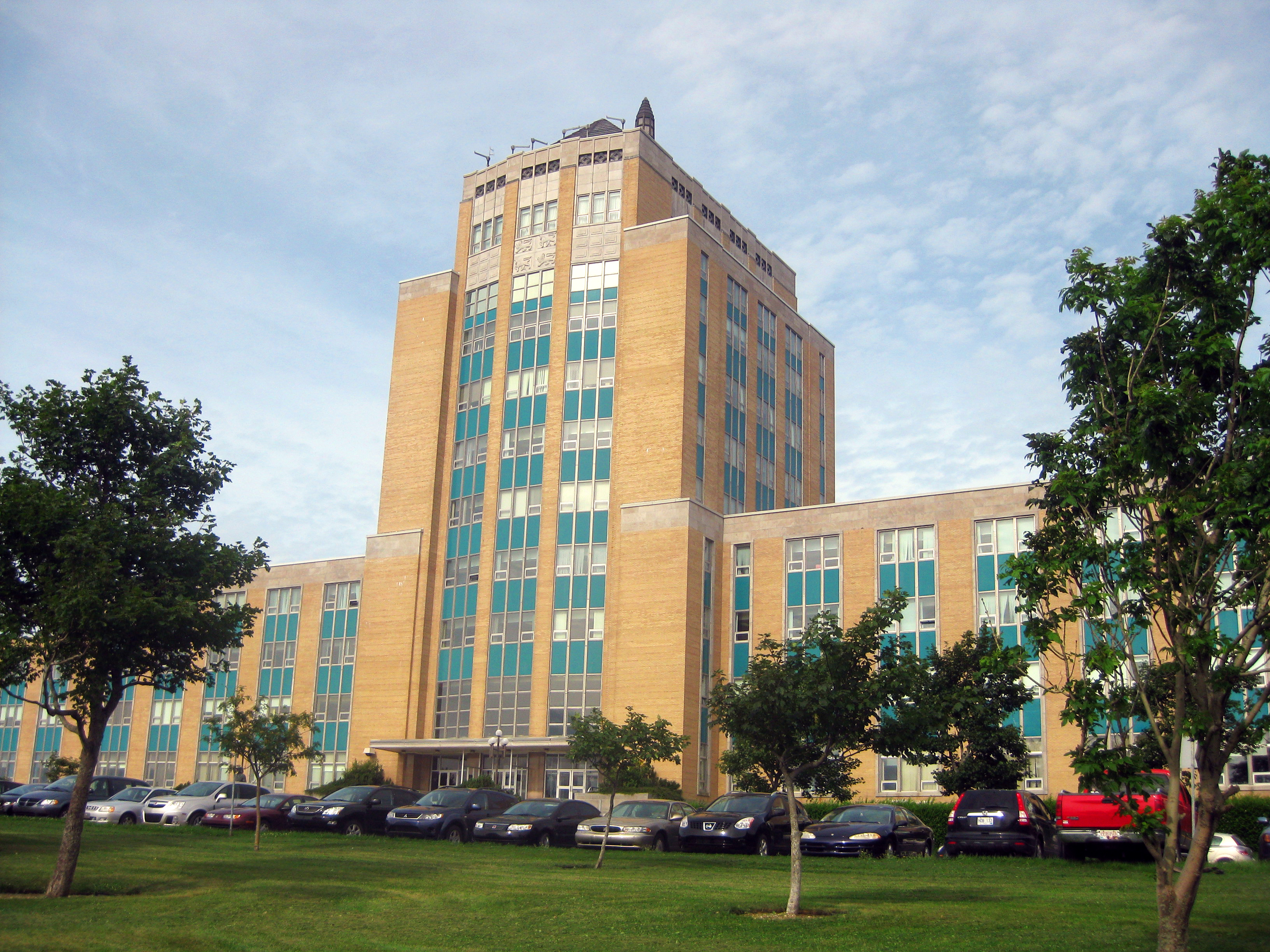
Confederation Building, St. John's, Newfoundland, Canada

- Confederation Building, St. John's, Newfoundland, 1960
- former Discovery Centre Building (originally Zellers department store), Halifax, Nova Scotia, 1939
- Dominion Public Building, Halifax, Nova Scotia, 1936
- Federal Building, Edmonton, Alberta, 1955
- Globe Theatre, Winnipeg, Manitoba
- Hotel Newfoundland, St. John's, Newfoundland and Labrador, 1926
- Maritime Life Building, Halifax, Nova Scotia, 1954
- Monarch Theatre, Medicine Hat, Alberta, 1920s
- National Research Foundation Building, Halifax, Nova Scotia, 1949
- Plaza Theatre, Calgary, Alberta, 1935
- Roblin Theatre, Roblin, Manitoba, 1939
- Roxy Theatre, Airdie, Alberta
- Scotia Bank (formerly Bank of Nova Scotia) Headquarters, Halifax, 1931
- SilverCity St. Vital, Winnipeg, Manitoba
- Sovereign Building, Halifax, Nova Scotia
- Vogue Cinema, Sackville, New Brunswick, 1946

=== British Columbia ===
Marine Building, Vancouver, British Columbia, Canada

- Bessborough Armory, Vancouver, 1932
- Burrard Street Bridge, Vancouver, 1932
- Capitol Theatre, Nelson, 1927
- Capitol Theatre, Port Hope, 1930
- Commodore Ballroom, Vancouver, 1929
- Dunbar Theatre, Vancouver, 1941
- Gotham Steakhouse, Vancouver, 1933
- Marine Building, (McCarter & Nairne), Vancouver, 1930
- Metro Theatre, Vancouver, 1941
- Prince Rupert City Hall, Prince Rupert, 1938
- Rio Theatre, Vancouver, 1938
- Royal Bank Tower, Vancouver, 1929
- Roxy Theatre, Revelstoke, 1905, 1937
- Sidney Roofing and Paper Company Ltd building, Granville Island, 1936
- St. James Anglican Church, Vancouver, 1937
- Stanley Industrial Alliance Stage, Vancouver, 1930
- Tidemark Theatre (formerly Van-Isle Theatre), Campbell River, 1947
- Tivoli Theatre, Creston, 1938
- Vancouver City Hall, Townley & Matheson, Vancouver, 1936
- Vancouver Island Regional Library, Campbell River, 1947
- Vogue Theatre, Vancouver, 1941

=== Ontario ===
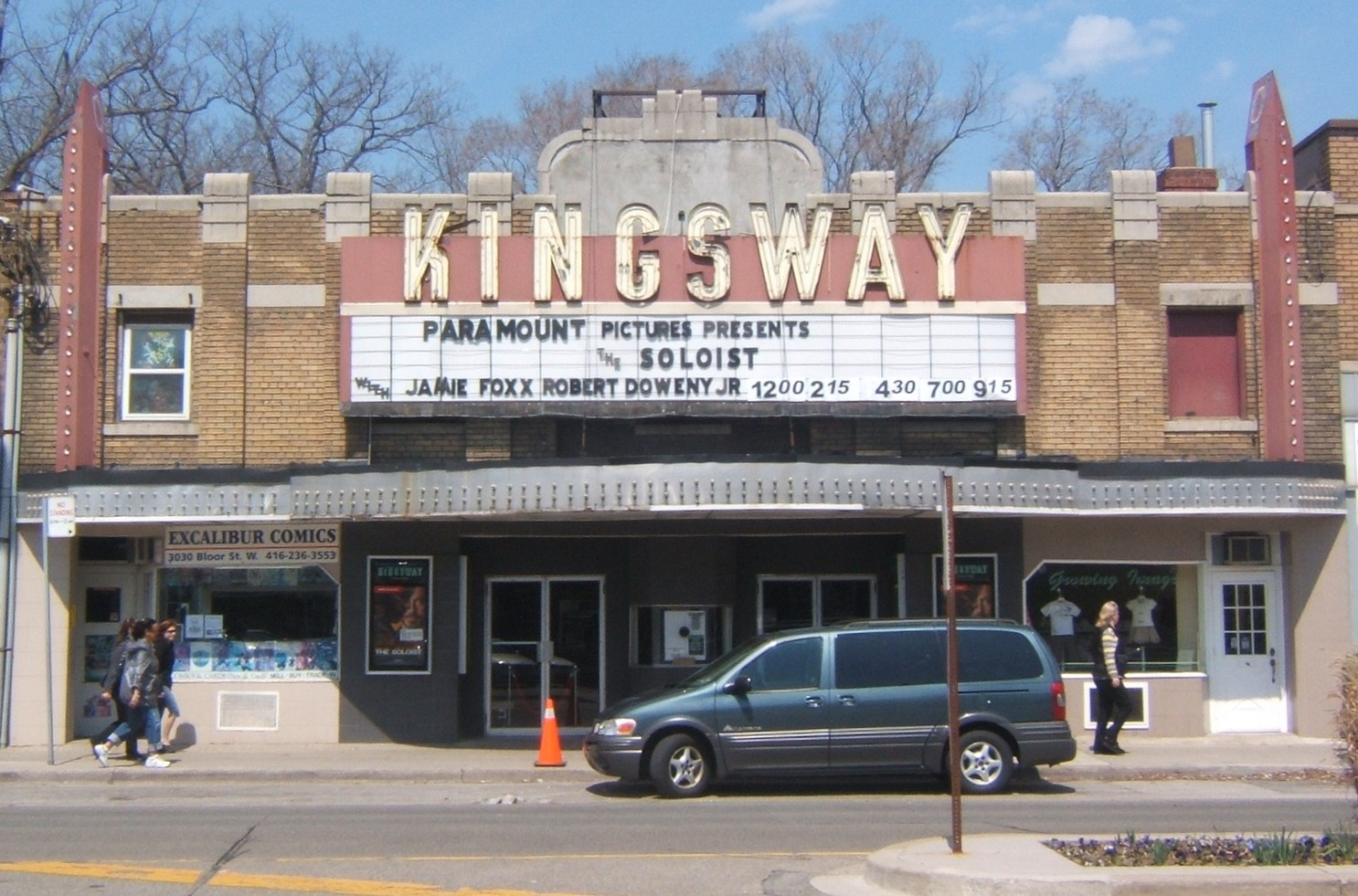
Kingsway Theatre, Toronto, Ontario, Canada

- 545 Lake Shore Boulevard West, Toronto, 1927
- Ambassador Bridge, Windsor to Detroit, 1927
- Arcadian Court, The Bay Department Store 8th Floor, Toronto, 1929
- Automotive Building, Toronto, 1929
- Bank of Montreal, Ottawa, 1930
- Bank of Nova Scotia, Toronto, 1951
- Balfour Building, Toronto, 1930s
- Bloor Collegiate Institute, Toronto, 1920
- Canada Building, Windsor, 1928
- Canada Permanent Trust Building, Toronto, 1930
- Central Post Office, Ottawa, 1939
- College Park Department Store Building, Toronto, 1930
- East and West Memorial Buildings, Ottawa, 1945
- École Routhier, Ottawa, 1932
- Eglinton Theatre, Toronto, 1936
- Exhibition Place (Automotive Building, Bandshell, Hollywood Bowl, Horse Palace), Toronto, 1929–1936
- Gayety Theatre, Collingwood, 1928
- Hambly House, Hamilton, 1939
- Hamilton GO Centre train and bus station, Hamilton, 1933
- Hardy Arcade, Ottawa, 1937
- Hart House Theatre, Toronto, 1919
- Hydro Electric Power Commission of Ontario, Toronto, 1935
- Hydro Electric Power Commission Building, Ottawa, 1934
- Hydro Electric Substation No 4., Ottawa
- Imperial Oil Centre for the Performing Arts, Sarnia, 1936
- Kingsway Theatre, Toronto, 1939
- Lawren Harris House, Toronto, 1930
- Maple Leaf Gardens, Ross and Macdonald, Toronto, 1931
- Metro Theatre, Toronto, 1938
- Michael Garron Hospital, Toronto, 1929
- Odeon Theatre, Sarnia, 1941
- Old Toronto Star Building, Toronto, 1929
- Old Walkerville Theatre, Windsor, 1918, 1930
- Paul Martin Sr. Building, Windsor, 1933
- Pigott Building, Hamilton, 1929
- Port Theatre, Cornwall, 1941
- Queen's Quay Terminal, Toronto, 1926
- R. C. Harris Water Treatment Plant, Toronto, 1941
- Radio City, Toronto, 1936
- Regent Gala Theatre, Toronto, 1927
- Roxy Theatres, Uxbridge
- Royal Edward Arms, Fort William, Thunder Bay, 1928
- Royal Ontario Museum, Toronto, 1914, 1932
- Seneca Queen Theatre, Niagara Falls, 1945
- Sir John A. Macdonald Building, Ottawa, 1930
- Spadina House (Spadina Museum: Historic House & Gardens), Toronto, 1912
- St. Michael's Hospital, Toronto, 1920
- Sterling Tower, Toronto, 1928
- Sunnyside Bus Terminal, Toronto, 1936
- Supreme Court of Canada, (Ernest Cormier), Ottawa, 1946
- Tip Top Tailors Building (Tip Top Lofts), Toronto, 1929
- Tivoli Theatre, Hamilton, 1924
- Toronto Coach Terminal, Toronto, 1931
- Toronto Postal Station K, Murray Brown for Canada Post, Toronto, Ontario 1936
- Toronto Stock Exchange (now part of the Toronto-Dominion Centre), Toronto, 1936
- Town Tavern, Toronto, 1949
- Vernon Town Theatre, Vernon
- Victoria Building, Ottawa, 1928

=== Quebec ===
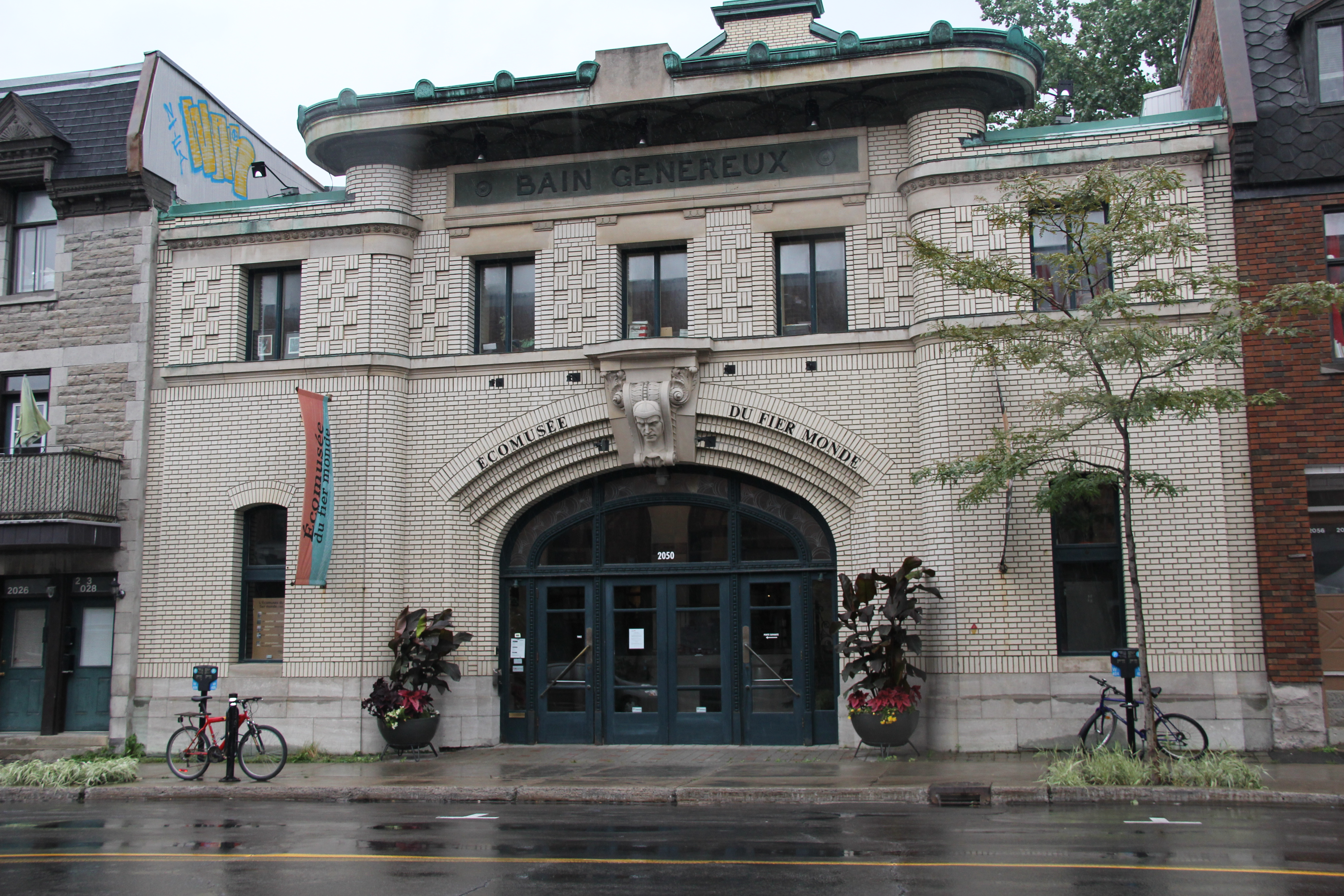
Écomusée du Fier Monde, Montréal, Quebec, Canada

- Aldred Building, Montreal, 1931
- Architects' Building, Montreal, 1931
- Atwater Market, Saint-Henri, Montreal, 1933
- Cinéma Le Château, Montreal, 1931
- Cinéma de Paris, Quebec City, 1948
- La Cité de l'Énergie theme park, Shawingan, 1911, 1928
- Canadian Triumphal Arch, Trois-Rivières Cathedral, Trois-Rivières,
- Clarendon Hotel, Old Quebec, Quebec City, 1927
- Complexe Les Ailes, Montreal, 1931
- Cormier House, Golden Square Mile, Montreal, 1931
- Eaton's Ninth Floor Restaurant is a copy of the huge Ile de France first class dining room (Jacques Carlu), Montreal, 1931
- Écomusée du fier monde museum, Montreal, 1920s
- Édifice Price (Price Building), Quebec City, 1931
- Empire Theatre, Quebec City
- Empress Theatre, Montreal, 1927
- Guaranteed Pure Milk bottle, Montreal, 1930
- Hanson Building, Montreal, 1928
- Hôpital de Verdun, Montreal, 1931
- Laurentian Hotel, Quebec, 1948
- Montreal Botanical Garden, Montreal, 1931
- Montreal Central Station, Montreal, 1943
- Montreal Star Building, Montreal, 1930
- Outremont Theatre, Outremont, Montreal, 1928
- Price Building (aka Édifice Price), Quebec City, Quebec 1931
- Saint-Esprit-de-Rosemont Church, Rosement-La Petite-Patrie, Montreal, 1933
- Saint-Jean-Berchmans Church, Rosement-La Petite-Patrie, Montreal, 1939
- Tramways Building, Montreal, 1928
- Université de Montréal central building (Ernest Cormier), Montreal 1940
- Verdun Natatorium, Verdun, 1930
- York Theatre, Montreal, 1938

=== Saskatchewan ===
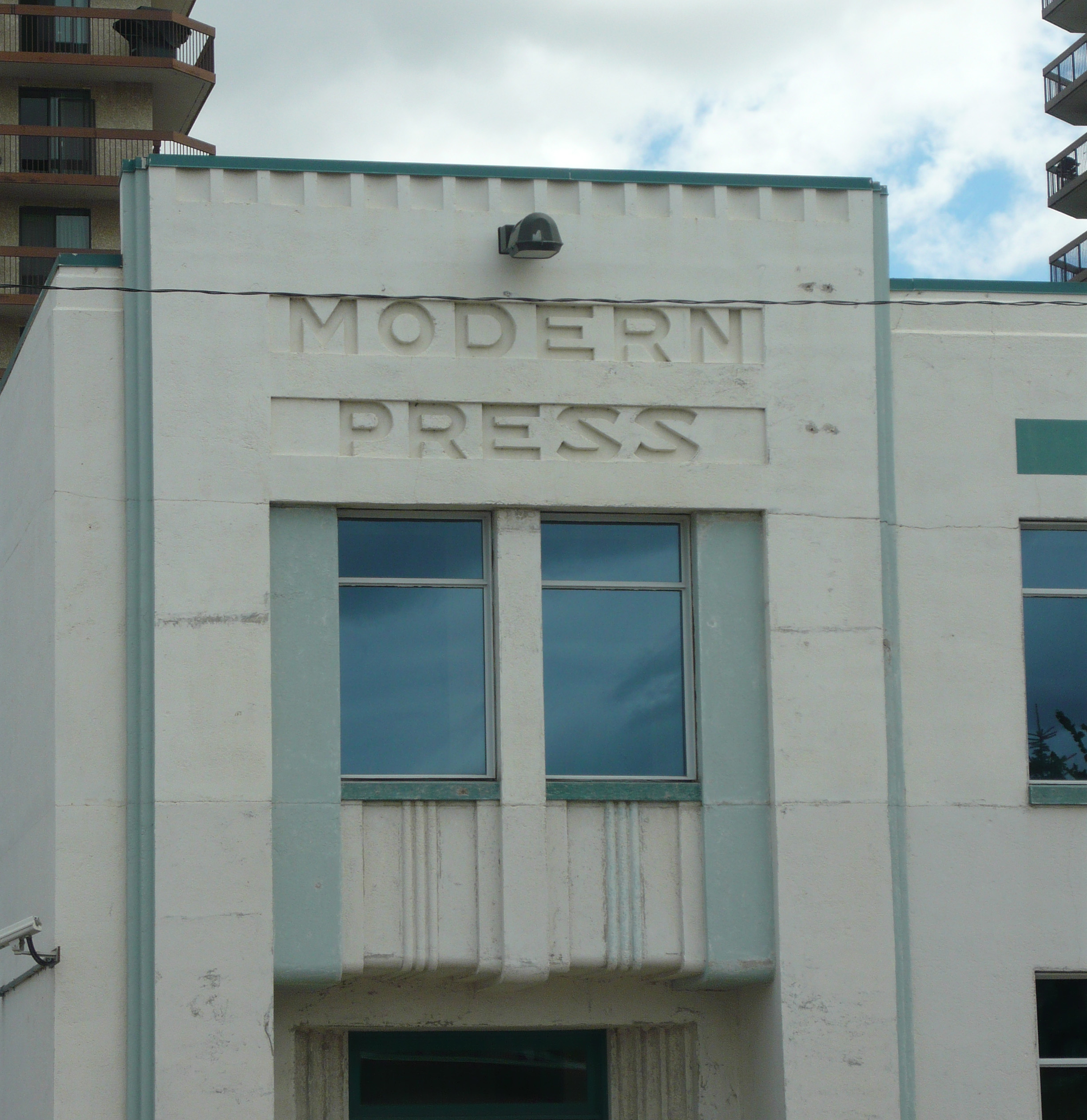
Modern Press Building, Saskatoon, Saskatchewan, Canada

- Adilman Building, Saskatoon, Saskatchewan, 1921
- Broadway Theatre, Saskatoon, Saskatchewan, 1946
- Casino Regina, Regina, Saskatchewan, 1912, 1931
- Dominion Government Building, Regina, Saskatchewan
- Modern Press Building, Saskatoon, Saskatchewan, 1927
- Vogue Cinema, Sackville, New Brunswick, 1946
- Yorkton Armoury, Yorkton, Saskatchewan, 1939

== Chile ==
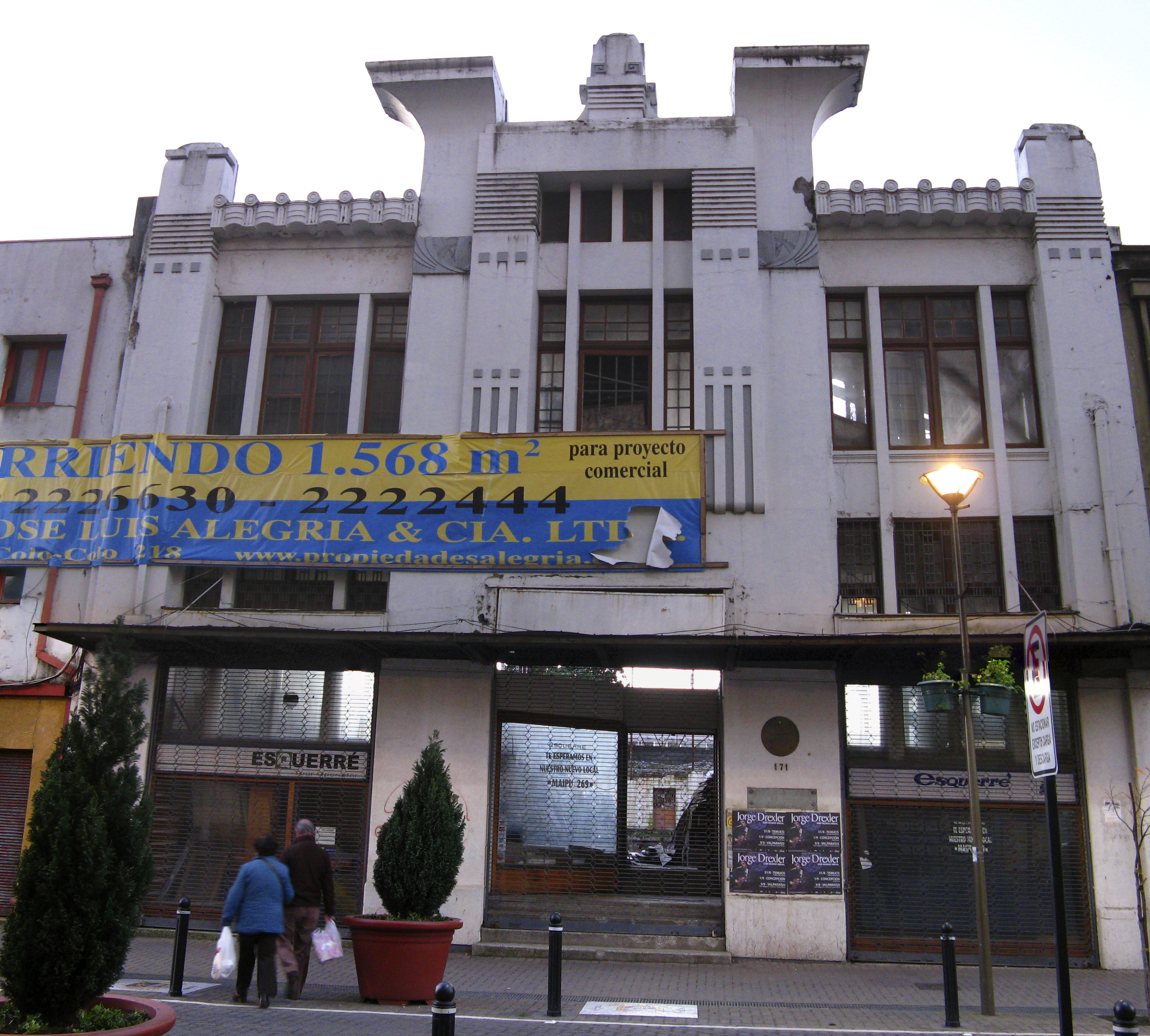
Casa Esquerre, Concepción, Chile

- Barrio Suboficiales de Caballería, Ñuñoa, Santiago, 1927
- Biblioteca de Santiago (Santiago Library), Santiago, 1930s
- Calle Keller (Keller Street), Providencia, Santiago Region, 1925
- Casa Esquerre, Concepción, 1928
- Cine Hoyts (originally Cine Metro), Valparaíso, 1948
- Club Náutico Cavalca, Iquique
- Conjunto Freire, Concepción, 1935
- Conjunto Prat, Concepción, 1930
- Conjunto Virginia Opazo (group of houses), Barrio República, Santiago, 1944
- Consejo Nacional de la Cultura y las Artes, Valparaíso, 1942
- Cuartel Central de Bombas (Central Fire Station), Talca
- Edificio Cooperativa Vitalicia, Valparaíso, 1946
- Edificio Sanitario FF.CC., Concepción, 1929
- Edificio del Servicio Nacional de Aduanas (National Customs Service Building), Valparaíso, 1928
- Edificios Turri, Santiago, 1929
- Estadio de Carabineros, Santiago, 1923
- Facultad de Derecho (School of Law), Universidad de Chile, Santiago, 1938
- Instituto de Anatomía Patológica, Universidad de Concepción, Concepción, 1929
- Mercado Centenario, Iquique, 1930
- El Palacio de los Tribunales de Justicia, Valparaíso, 1939
- Piscina Escolar (pool) de la Universidad de Chile, Santiago, 1929
- Población Los Castaños, Independencia, Santiago Region, 1930
- Residential Metro, Concepción
- Teatro Municipal de Valparaíso, Valparaíso, 1931
- Teatro Universidad de Chile (formerly the Baquedano Theatre), Santiago, 1931

== Colombia ==
=== Barranquilla ===
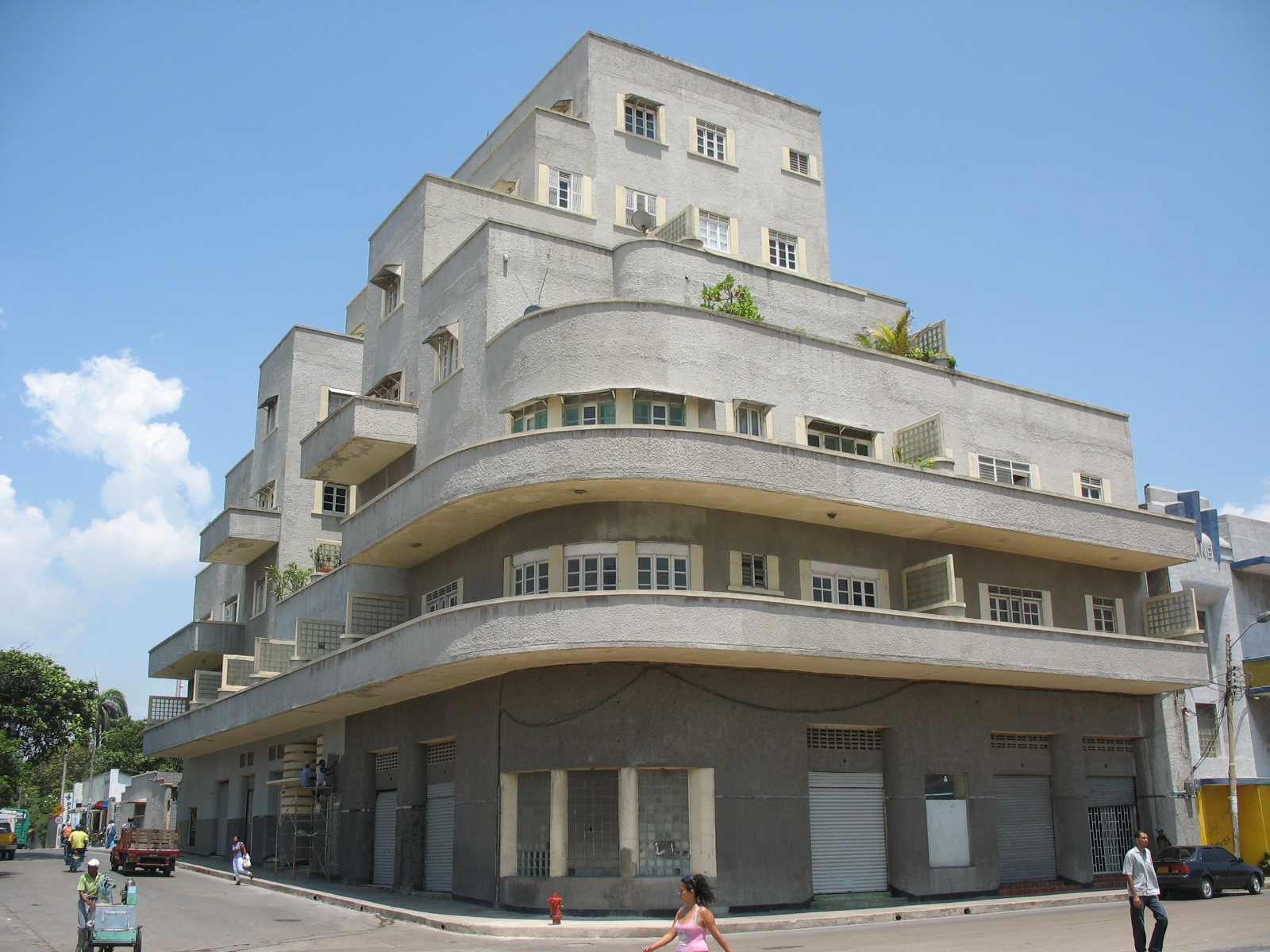
Edificio García, Barranquilla.

- Barranquilla Calle Real
- Biblioteca Pública Departamental Meira Delmar, 1921
- Casa Manuel Carrerá, Barranquilla, 1940
- Centro Comercial Avianca (formerly the Scadta Building), 1935
- Cine Rex, 1939
- Cristobal Colón Theatre
- Edificio Eckardt, 1939
- Edificio Garcia apartments, 1930s
- Edificio Hane, 1942
- Hotel Roxy
- Romelio Martínez Stadium, 1934
- Shaare Sedek Synagogue, 1947
- Edificio Emiliani
- Teatro Colón, 1947

=== Bogotá ===
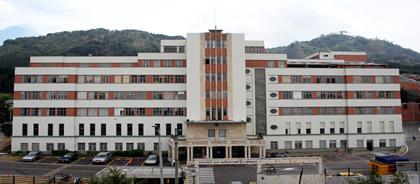
Colegio San Bartolomé La Merced, Bogotá.

- Biblioteca Nacional de Colombia, 1933
- Edificio Vengoechea, 1933
- Universidad de la Salle, 1933
- Alberto Sanz Building, 1936
- Clínica Dr. Restrepo Building, 1936
- Teatro al Parque Nacional, 1936
- Teatro Municipal Jorge Eliécer Gaitán, 1938
- Teatro San Jorge, 1938
- Teatro Mogador, 1938
- Teatro de la Media Torta, 1938
- Teatro Roxy (Lux), 1940s
- Sotomayor Building, 1940s
- Hotel Casa Deco La Concordia, 1940s
- House - Calle 12, 1940s
- House - Calle 61, 1940s
- House - Calle ?, 1940s
- Colegio San Bartolomé La Merced, 1941
- Córdoba Building, 1945
- San Carlos Hospital, 1947
- Escuela Taller de Bogotá
- Hostal Casa Quevedo
- Hotel Zaragona
- Teatro Egipto, 1950s

Cali

- Balcón del Campestre
- Café Boulevard
- Edificio Jorge Garcés Borrero
- Edificio Ulpiano Lloreda
- Hotel Astoria Real
- Hotel Azor
- Hotel Imperio

Cartagena

- Edificio Ganem, 1948
- Hotel Caribe

Manizales

- Palacio de Bellas Artes (Manizales), 1951

Medellín

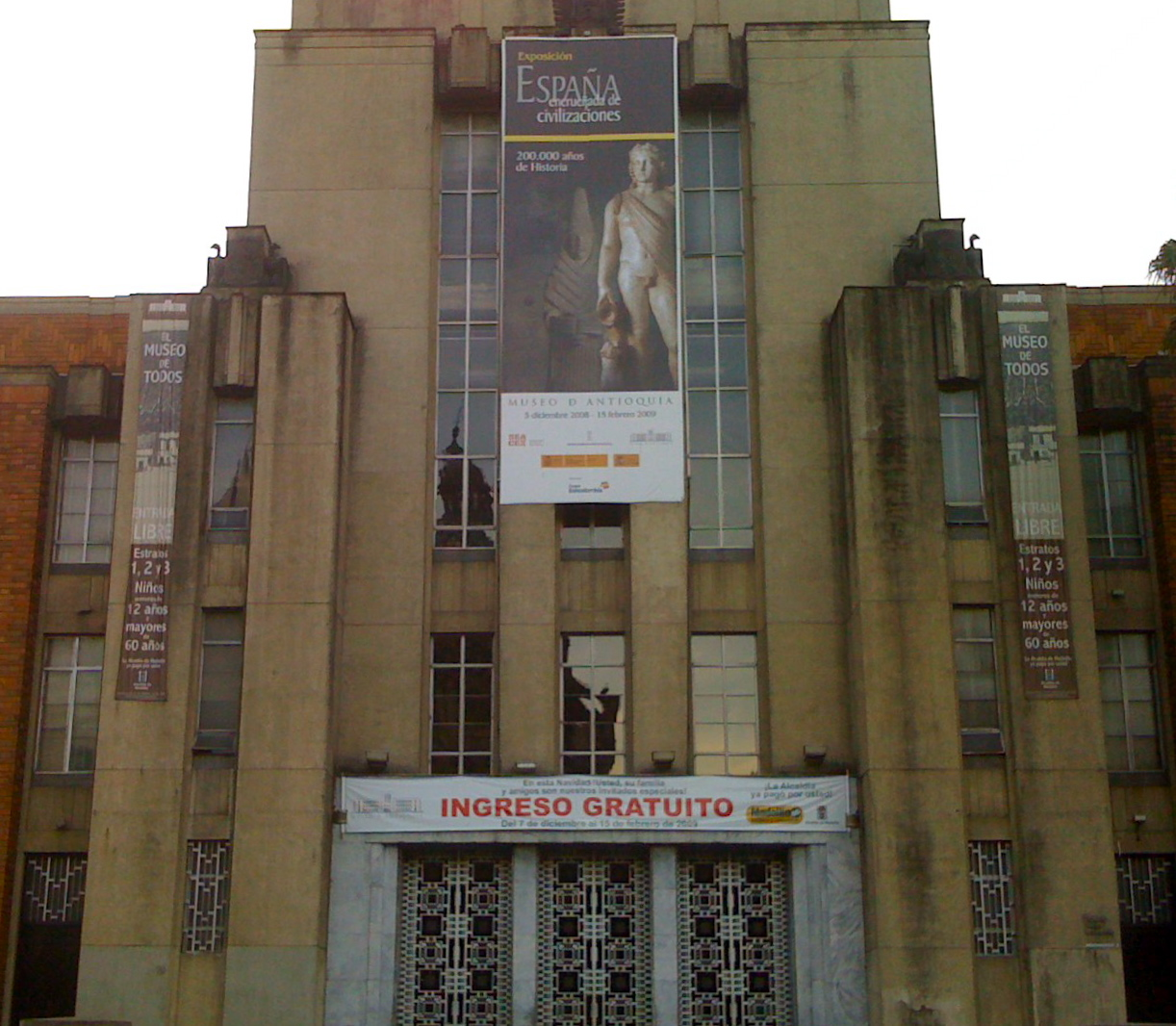
Museo de Antioquia, Medellín.

- Hotel Nutibara, 1945
- Museo de Antioquia (formerly office of the Mayor), 1937
- Teatro Lido, 1947

Mocoa

- Gymnasium, Mocoa

Santa Marta

- Gobernación del Magdalena (formerly the Hotel Tayrona), 1948
- Teatro Santa Marta, 1942

Tunja

- Cine Teatro Boyacá
- Cine Teatro Quiminza
- Edificio Cooservicios
- Parque Santander, 1939
- Teatro Cultural

== Costa Rica ==
- Banco Nacional de Costa Rica, San José, 1948
- former Cine Líbano, San José, 1924
- Correo Central (Edificio Herdocia y Edificio Fischel), San José
- Edificio Herdocia, San José, 1945
- Gimnasio del Colegio San Luis Gonzaga (High school gymnasium), San José
- Gran Hotel (Costa Rica), San José, 1930
- Hospital Calderón Guardia San José, 1943
- Hospital San Juan de Dios, San José
- Hotel Kekoldi, San José
- Mercado Central, San José
- Municipal Theater, Alajuela
- El Progreso Panadería, San José
- former Teatro Palace (now Food Mall), San José, 1930s

== Cuba ==
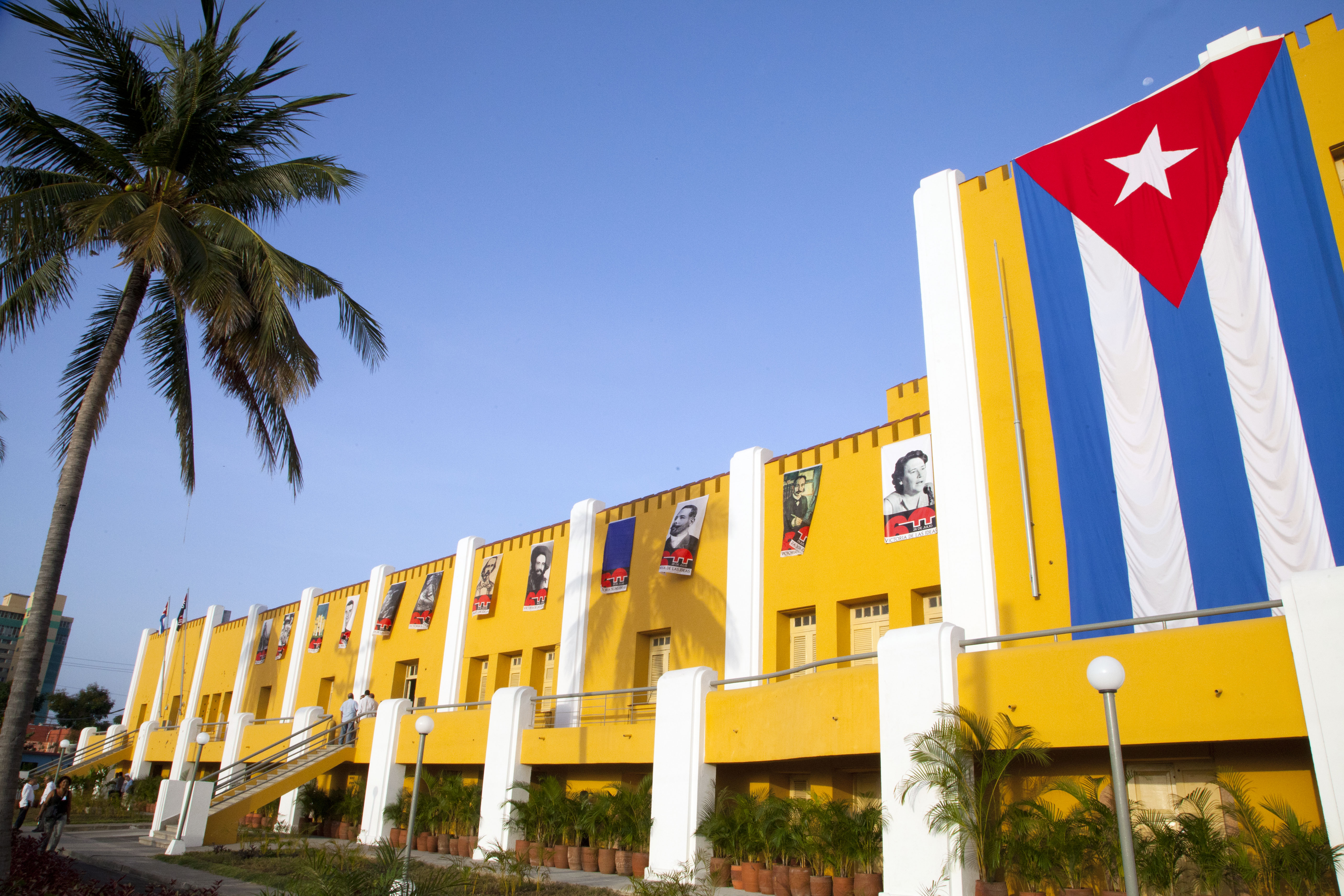
Moncada Barracks, Santiago, Cuba

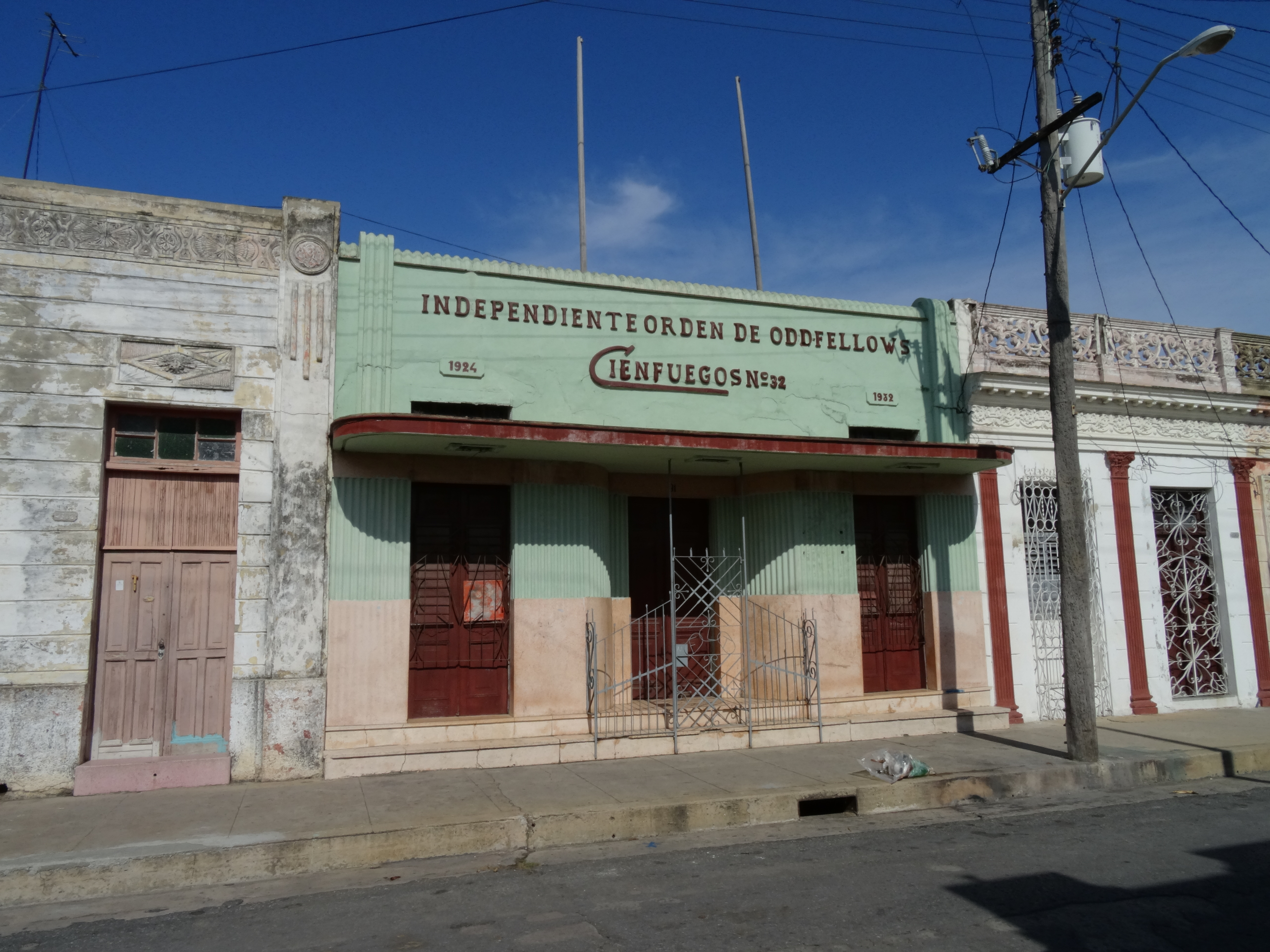
Independiente Orden de Oddfellows, Cienfuegos, Cuba

- Agricultural Market - Mercado Agropecuario "La Plaza," Santiago de Cuba
- Camagüey Hotel (formerly Ignacio Agramonte Provincial Museum), La Vigia, Camagüey, 1948
- Carilda Oliver House, Matanzas
- Casa Garay (Guayabita chocolate factory), Pinar del Rio, 1931
- Centro Cultural Alkázar, La Caridad, Camagüey
- Centro Escolar, Holguín
- Cine Carmen, Ciego de Avila, Camagüey, 1945
- Cine Frexes, Holguín
- Cine-Teatro Luisa, Cienfuegos, 1911, 1931
- Colegio de Champagnat, La Vigia, Camagüey, 1941
- Convent of the Servants of Mary chapel, Cienfuegos, 1940
- Enseñanza Politecnica Holguín (and garage and cafeteria), Holguín
- Escuela Profesional de Comercio, Santiago de Cuba
- History Museum (formerly Moncada Barracks), Santiago de Cuba
- Hospital Clínico Quirúrgico Docente Ambrosio Grillo Portuondo, Santiago de Cuba
- Independent Order of Oddfellows (Independiente Orden de Oddfellows), Cienfuegos, 1924
- Methodist Church, Baracoa
- National Medical College, Holguín
- Santa Clara Libre Hotel, Santa Clara
- Teatro Alkázar, Sagua la Grande, Las Villas Province, 1936
- Teatro Cardenas, Cardenas, Matanzas
- Templo Bautista Nazaret (Baptist church), Cienfuegos, 1936
- Tomb of José Martí, Santa Ifigenia Cemetery, Santiago de Cuba
- Wenceslao Infante Theater, Holguín, 1948

=== Havana ===
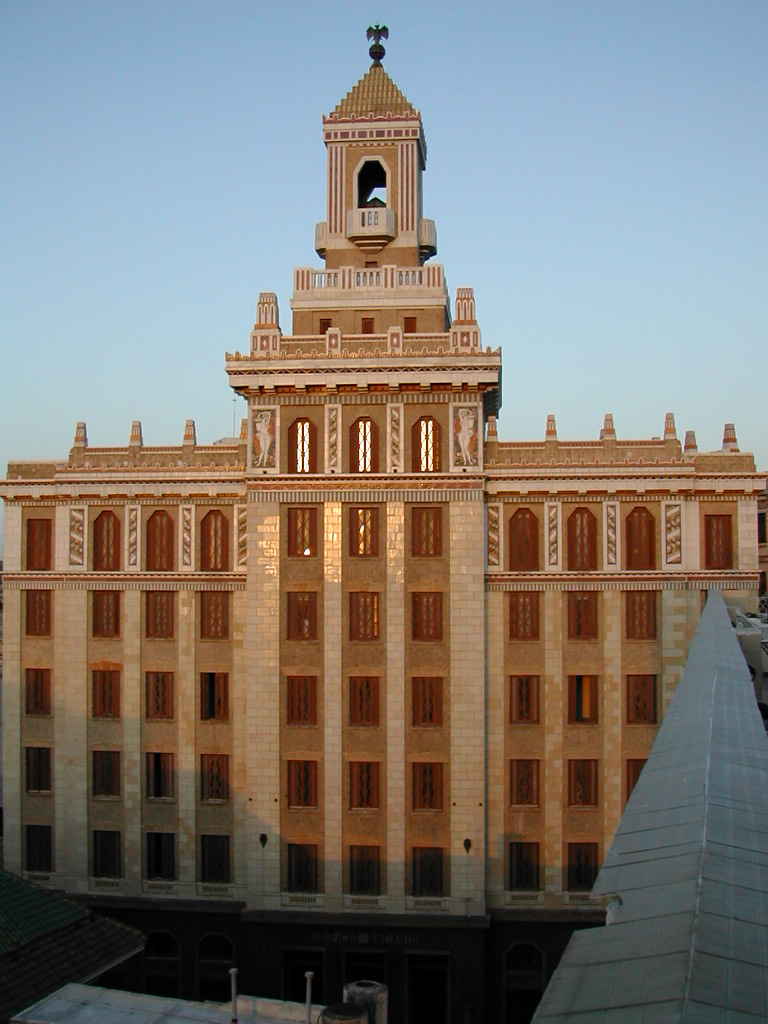
Bacardi Building, Havana, Cuba

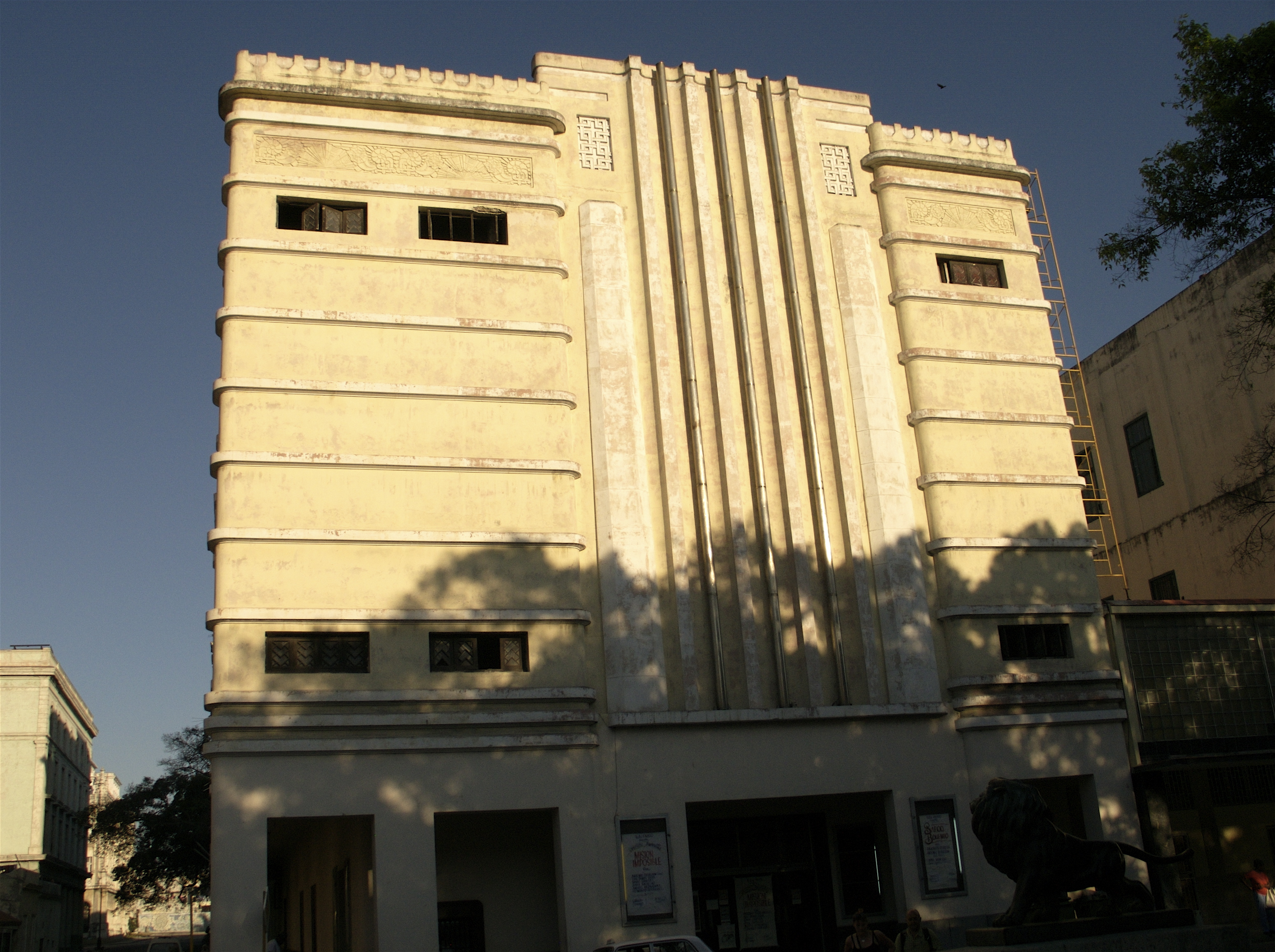
Cine-Teatro Fausto, Havana, Cuba

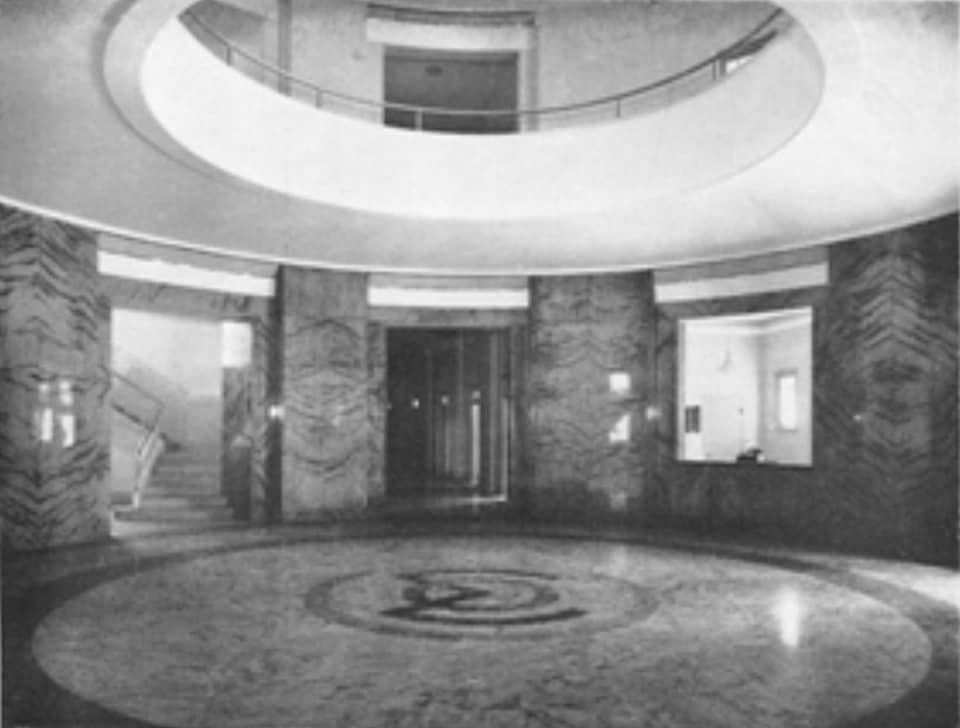
Maternidad Obrera de Marianao building lobby, 1941

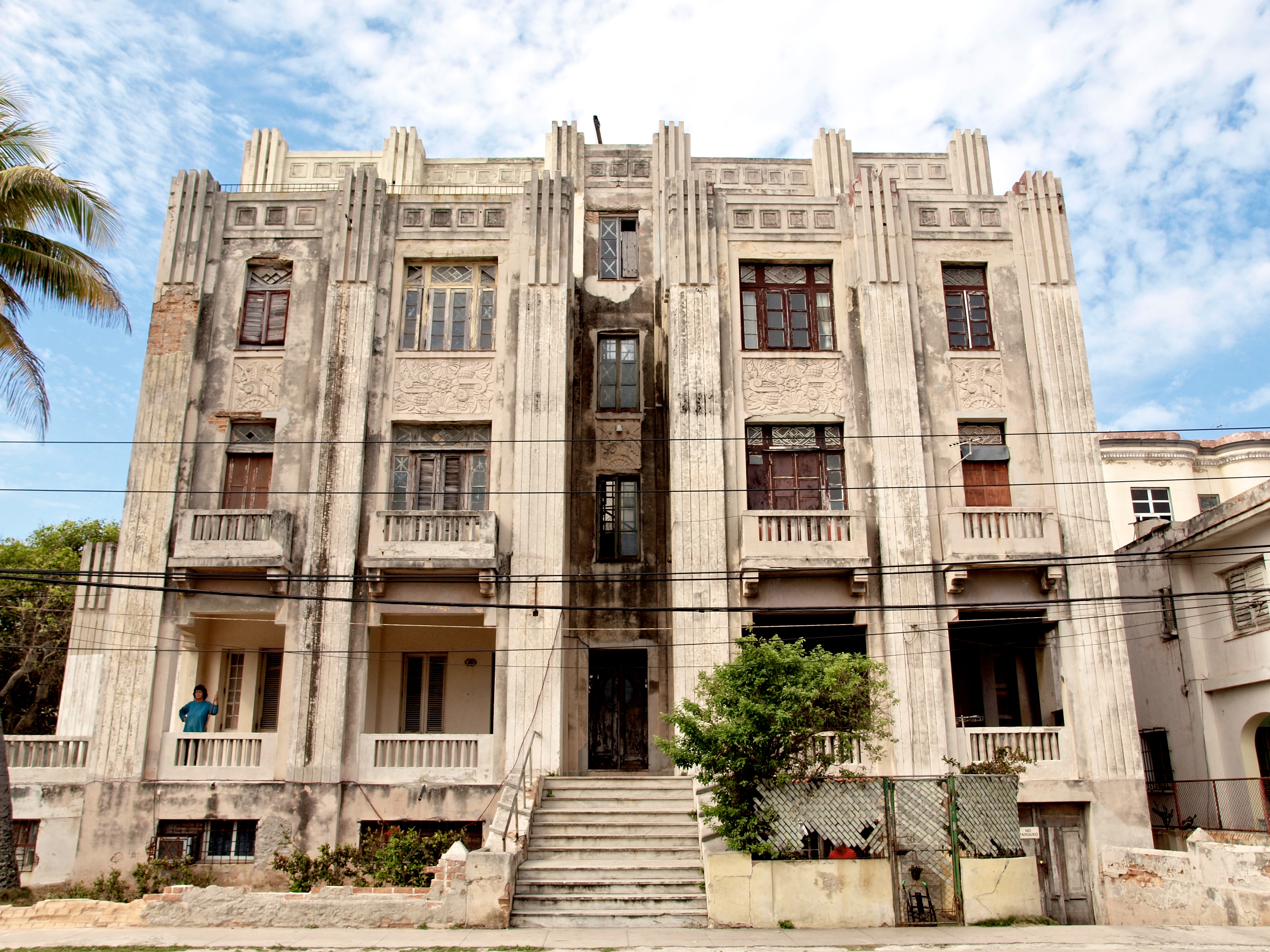
A rundown Art Deco building in Havana, Cuba

- Angelina Espina house, Havana
- Bacardi Building (Havana), Havana, 1930
- Casa de Julia Tarafa, Havana
- Casa de las Americas, Havana
- Casa de la Amistad (formerly the Catalina de Laza mansion), Vedado, Havana
- Casa Particular, Habana Vieja, Havana
- Casa Quinlana apartments, Vedado, Havana
- Catalina de Laza mausoleum in the Cristobal Colón Cemetery, Havana
- Cine La Edad de Oro (formerly Cine Santa Catalina), Mendoza, Havana, 1946
- Cine Metropolitan, Ampliación de Almendares, Havana, 1949
- Cine Moderno, Jesus del Monte, Havana, 1929
- former Cine Reina, Havana
- Cine-Teatro América (in the Rodriquez Vazquez building) Habana Vieja, Havana, 1941
- Cine-Teatro Fausto, Habana Vieja, Havana, 1938
- Cine-Teatro Sierra Maestra, Rancho Boyeros, Havana, 1932
- Cinema Arenal, Playa, Havana, 1945
- Club de Cantineros (Cuban Bartender's Club), Havana
- College of Architects (Colegio Nacional de Arquitectos de Cuba), Vedado, Havana, 1926
- Cuervo-Rubio Apartments, Vedado, Havana
- Edificio Mina, Havana
- Edificio Traiángulo apartments, Vedado, Havana
- El País newspaper building, Havana
- Emilio Vasconcelos residence, Vedado, Havana
- Francisco Argüelles House, Miramar, Havana, 1927
- Gonzalo Arostegui Residence, Kohly, Havana
- Hilda Sarra House, Marianao, Havana, 1936
- Hospital Materno Infantil Eusebio Hernández (Maternidad Obrera), Havana, 1939
- Hotel Nacional de Cuba, Havana
- Hotel Palacio Cueto, Havana
- José Martí Memorial, Havana, 1958
- La Moderna Poesia bookstore, Old Havana, Havana, 1939
- López Serrano Building, Vedado, Havana, 1932
- Manuel Lopez Chavez residence, Kohly, Havana
- Maternidad Obrera de Marianao, Havana, 1941
- Mercedes L. Navarro House, Vedado, Havana
- Miguel de Soto Methodist Church, Havana
- Modelo Brewery, Havana, 1948
- Ricardo Hernández Beguerie House, Miramar, Havana
- Sloppy Joe's Bar, Havana, Havana
- Solimar Building, Havana, 1944
- Solomon Kalmanowitz House, Miramar, Havana
- Tabacalera Insurance Company building, Havana

== Curaçao ==
- Cinelandia, Willemstad, 1932
- Saint Tropez Ocean Club, Willemstad

== Dominican Republic ==
- Banco de Reservas de la República Dominicana, Santo Domingo, 1941
- Catedral de San Felipe Apóstol (Cathedral of St. Philip the Apostle), Puerto Plata, 1956
- Columbus Lighthouse, Santo Domingo Este, designed 1931, built 1986
- El Conde, Santo Domingo
- Luna's Bed and Breakfast (Formerly the Foreigners Club) Colonial Zone, Santo Domingo, 1935
- Washington Institute, Parque Independencia, Santo Domingo

== El Salvador ==
- Centro de Gangas, Chalchuapa, 1930s
- De Sola Building, San Salvador, 1930s
- Estadio Jorge "Mágico" González, San Salvador, 1932
- Consultorio Médico San Vicente de Paul, San Salvador, 1940s
- Sociedad de Empleados de Comercio, San Salvador, 1940s
- Bar La Praviana, San Salvador, 1940s
- Banco de Londres & Montreal, San Salvador, 1940s
- Hotel Centro Histórico, San Salvador, 1940s
- F.A. Dalton & Co Building, San Salvador, 1940s
- Vidri Building, San Salvador, 1940s
- Lourdes Building, San Salvador, 1940s
- Pan Lido Building, San Salvador, 1940s
- General Electric Building, San Salvador, 1940s
- José Gadala María Building, San Salvador, 1940s
- La Constancia Building, San Salvador, 1940s
- La Mariposa Building, San Salvador, 1940s
- La Cafetalera Building, San Salvador, 1940s
- Goldtree Liebes Building, San Salvador, 1940
- Monumento al Divino Salvador del Mundo, San Salvador, 1942
- Casino Building, San Salvador, 1944
- Regalado Building, San Salvador, 1948
- Veiga Building, San Salvador, 1948
- Dueñas Building, San Salvador, 1948–1986
- Julia L. de Duke Building, San Salvador, 1949
- Comercial Building, San Salvador, 1950s
- San Francisco Building, San Salvador, 1950–1986
- Monumento a la Revolución, San Salvador, 1950
- Central Building, San Salvador, 1954
- Auto Palace, San Salvador, 1955
- Hospital de Maternidad, San Salvador, 1954–2019
- Gimnasio Nacional José Adolfo Pineda, San Salvador, 1956
- Cine Apolo, San Salvador, 1966

== Ecuador ==
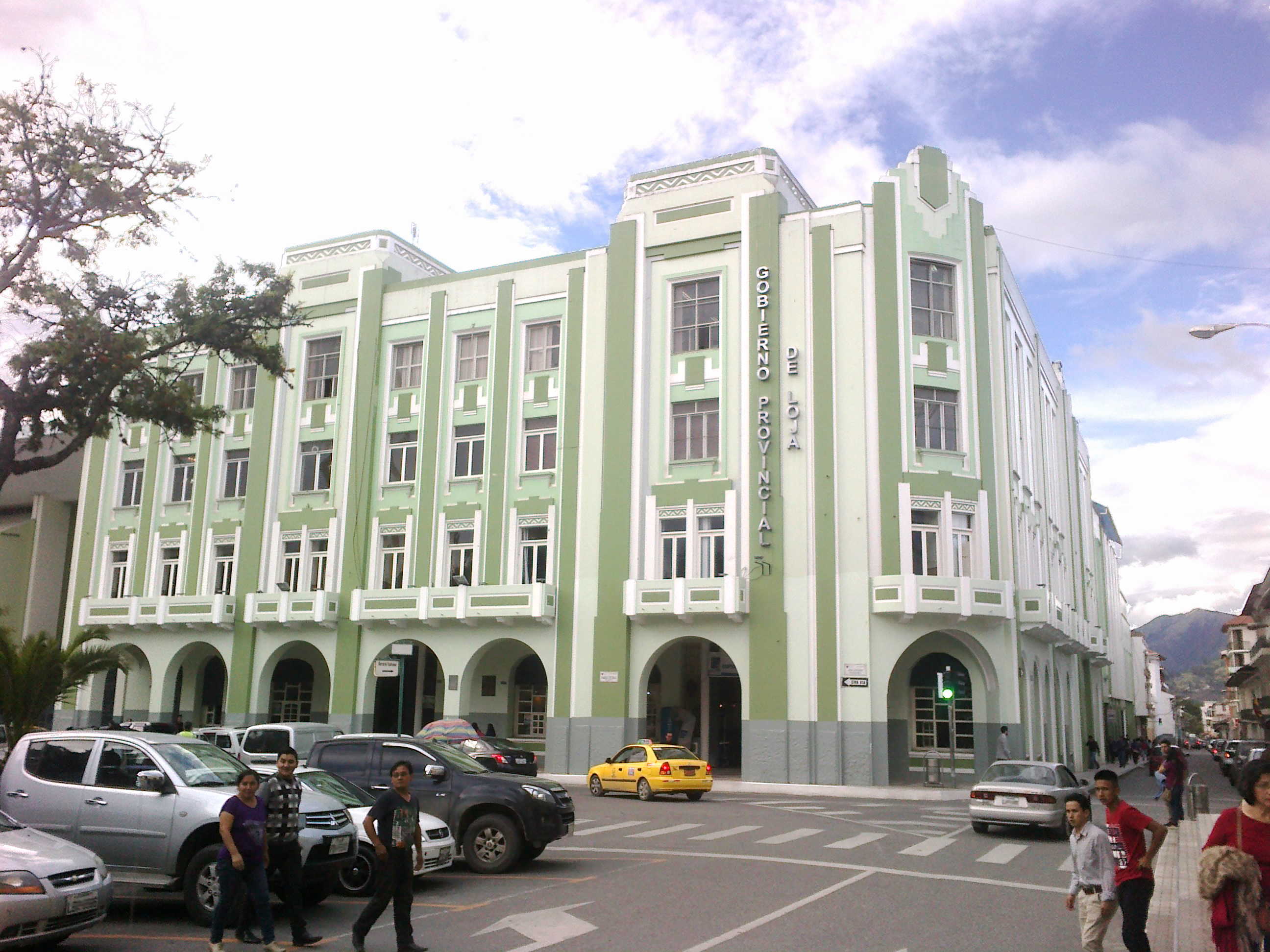
Provincial Government Building, in Loja.

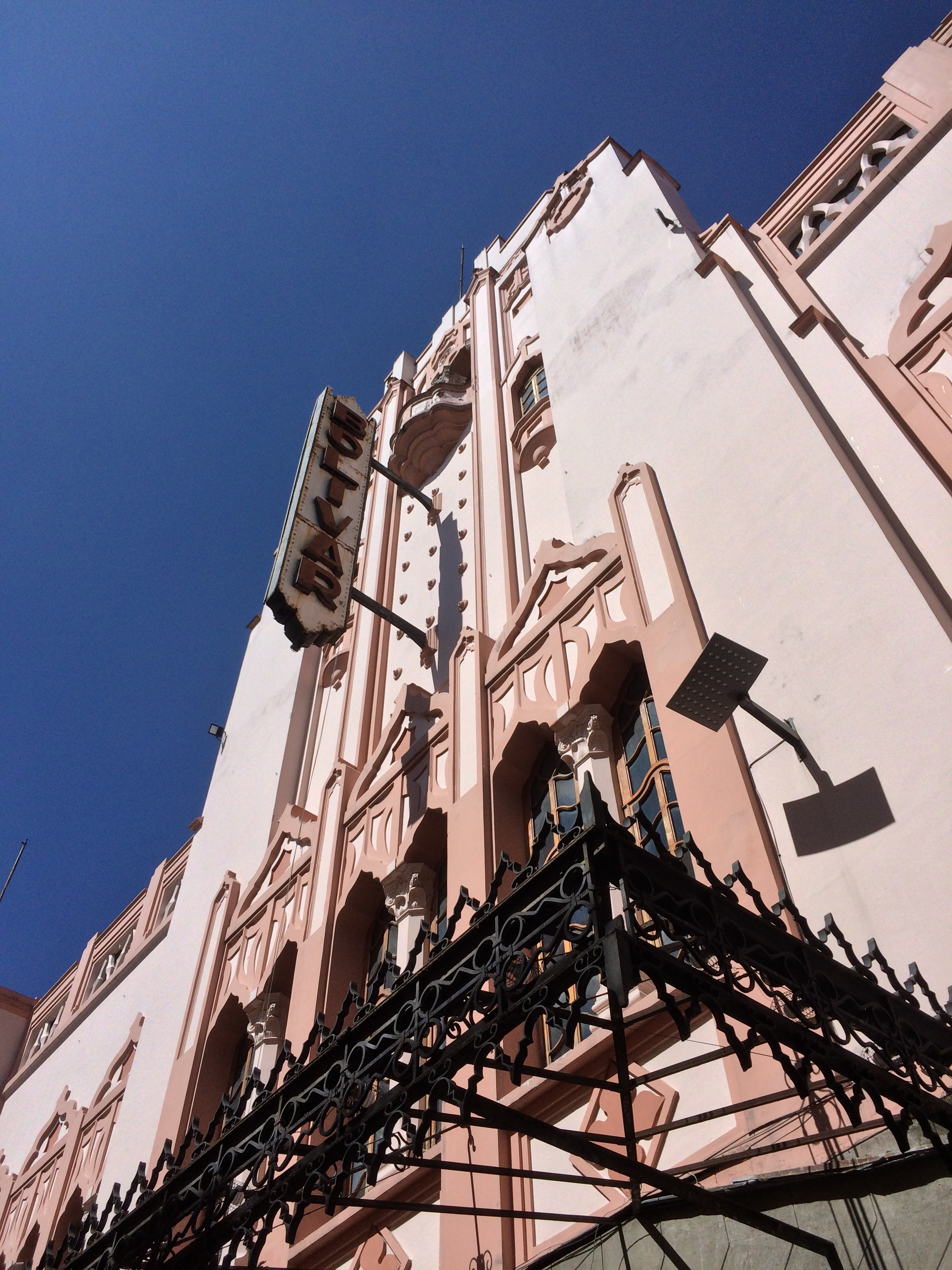
Teatro Bolívar, in Quito.

- Banco Nacional de Fomento, Latacunga
- Cine 9 de Octubre, Guayaquil
- Clínica del Seguro Social, Latacunga
- Colegio La Salle, Latacunga
- Colegio San Gabriel, Quito
- Colegio Vicente Rocafuerte, Guayaquil
- Edificio La Previsora Centro, Quito, 1935
- Edificio Tosi, Guayaquil, 1939
- Estadio El Ejido, Quito, 1932
- Estadio Municipal, Otavalo
- Fiscalía Provincial del Azuay (Prosecutor's Office), Cuenca
- Hostal Residencia Sucre, Quito
- Hotel Rosím, Latacunga
- Instituto Ecuatoriano de Seguridad Social, Cuenca
- Latacunga Train Station, Latacunga, 1941
- Mercado 10 de Noviembre, Guaranda
- Provincial Government Building, Loja
- Teatro Bolívar, Quito, 1933
- Train Station, Latacunga, 1941

== Guatemala ==
- 192-212 15 avenida A, 2-28 zona1, Quezaltenango-Xela
- Club Tennis Quetzaltenango-Xela, Quetzaltenango-Xela
- Edificio Gutiérrez, Quetzaltenango-Xela
- El Monumento a Justo Rufino Barrios, Quetzaltenango-Xela

=== Guatemala City ===
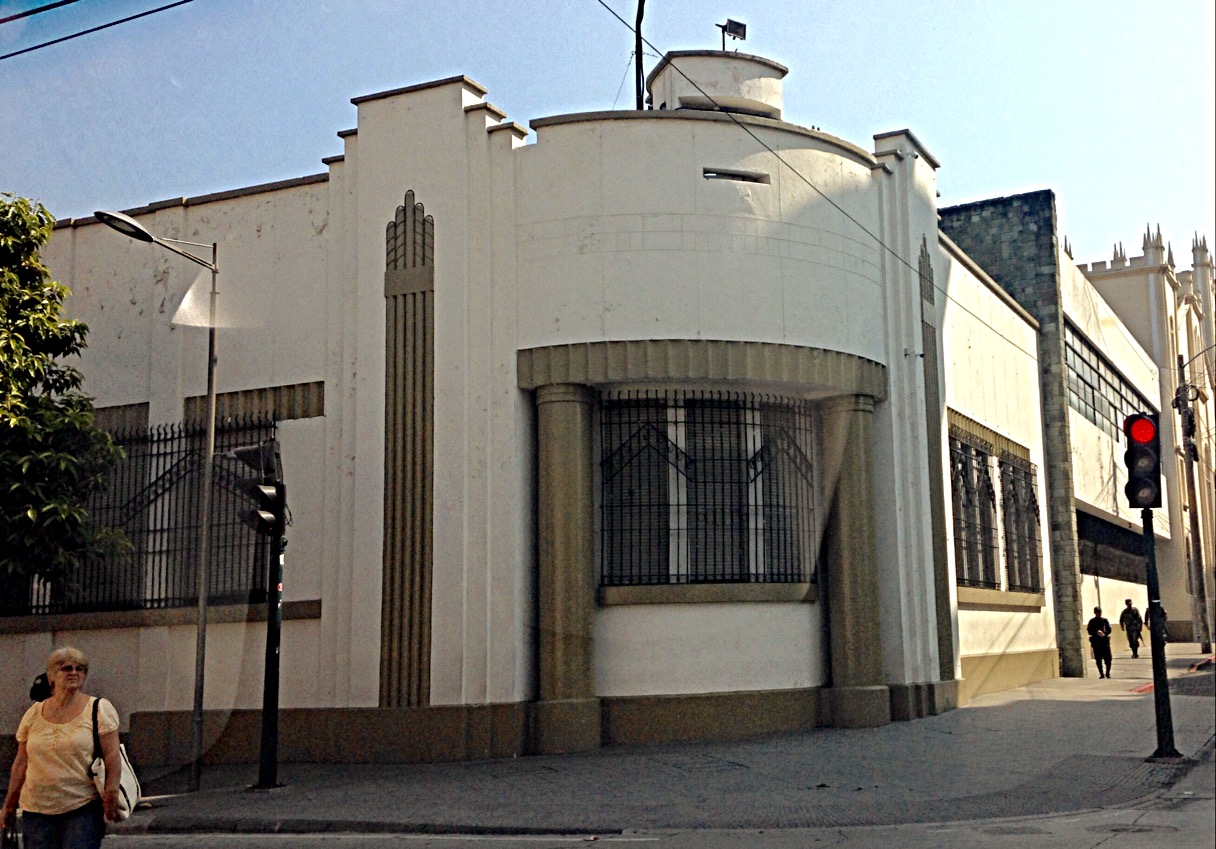
Presidential Palace, Guatemala City, Guatemala

- Biblioteca Nacional (National Library), Guatemala, 1957
- former Cine Fox, Guatemala City
- Cine Lux (now Centro Cultural de España en Guatemala), Guatemala City, 1936
- Cine Tikal, Guatemala City
- Conservatorio Nacional de Música (National Musical Conservatory), Guatemala City, 1955
- Crédito Hipotecario Nacional, Guatemala City
- Edificio Colon, Guatemala City
- Edificio Engel, Guatemala City, 1950
- Edificio Fogel, Guatemala City, 1937
- Edificio La Perla, Guatemala City, 1927
- Edificio Orriols, Guatemala City
- Edificio Venus, Guatemala City
- Hotel Fuentes, Guatemala City
- Imprenta Hispania, Centro Histórico, Guatemala City, 1927
- Mercado La Palmita, Guatemala City
- Museo de Historia Natural, Guatemala City, 1950
- Presidential Palace (Casa Presidencial), Guatemala City, 1931, 1951

== Honduras ==
- Alcaldía Municipal (city hall), León, 1942
- Cine Colombia, San Pedro Sula, 1935
- Cine El Hispano (formerly Cine Apolo), Comayagüela, 1934, 1944
- Empresa Nacional de Energía Eléctrica, Tegucigalpa
- Hotel Art Deco Beach, La Ceiba
- Palacio Municipal, San Pedro Sula, 1940
- Plaza de la Cultura (formerly the Instituto José Trinidad Reyes), San Pedro Sula, 1940s

== Mexico ==
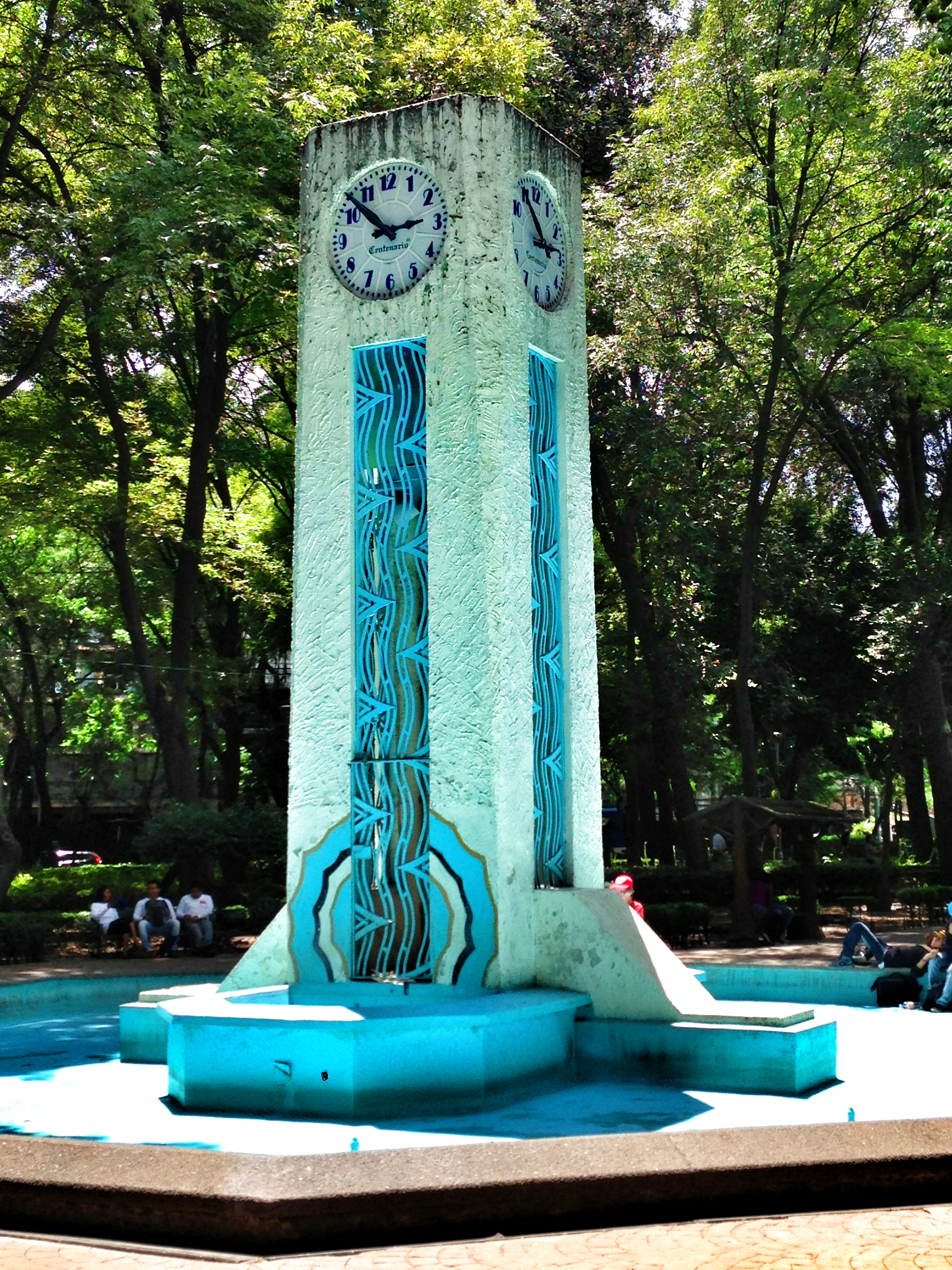
Art deco clock in Parque México, col. Hipódromo, Condesa, Mexico City

- 600 Calle Hermenegildo Galeana, Ciudad Obregón, Sonora
- Ateneo Fuente, Saltillo, Coahuila, 1933
- Av. José María Morelos 600, Centro, Oaxaca, 1924
- Caja Popular Mexicana, Murguía Street, Centro, Oaxaca
- Centro Escolar Revolución, Ciudad Juárez, Chihuahua, 1939
- former Cine Reforma, Puebla, 1939
- Cine Roble, Tijuana
- Cine Zaragoza, Tijuana, 1944
- Coliseo Cinema, Puebla, 1940
- Escuela Primaria General Ángel Flores (elementary school), Culiacán, Sinaloa, 1948
- Estadio Revolución (Baseball stadium), Torreón, Coahuila, 1932
- Expendio Tradición restaurant, Oaxaca
- Mercado Juárez, Juárez, Chihuahua
- Monument to José María Morelos, Janitzio Island, Pátzcuaro, Michoacán, 1933
- Monumental Clock of Acaxochitlán (Clock Tower), Acaxochitlán, Hidalgo, 1932

=== Guadalajara ===
- 502 Mezquitán, Centro, Guadalajara, 1940s
- Alemania 1285, Moderna, Guadalajara, 1920s
- Casa Fayette hotel, Guadalajara, 1940s
- Centro Escolar Basilio Vadillo, Guadalajara
- former Cine Obregón, Oblatos, Guadalajara, 1948
- Cinepolis (formerly Teatro Alameda), Guadalajara, 1942
- former Cine Real (now commercial/retail), Jardines de San Francisco, Guadalajara, 1960
- Cine Roxy, Guadalajara, 1937
- Colectivo restaurant, Guadalajara, 1940
- Coronel Calderón 526 – Casa Cordero, Retiro, Guadalajara, 1930s
- Emerson 74, Colonia Americana, Guadalajara, 1935
- Frías 345, 349, Santa Teresita, Guadalajara, 1940s
- Hotel Alameda, Guadalajara
- José Guadalupe Zuno 2103, 2117, 2141, Colonia Lafayette, Guadalajara
- LArVa (Laboratorio de Arte Variedades, formerly Cine Variedades), Guadalajara, 1940
- Manzano 392, Mexicaltzingo, Guadalajara
- Nuestra Senora del Sagrado Corazon church, Guadalajara
- Pedro Moreno 102 – Edificio Carballo, Colonia Americana, Guadalajara
- Pedro Moreno 1740, Colonia Americana, Guadalajara, 1938
- Penitenciaria 22, Colonia Americana, Guadalajara
- Plaza Alameda (formerly Teatro Alameda), Guadalajara, 1942
- San Felipe 316, Centro, Guadalajara
- Simón Bolívar 326, Obrera, Guadalajara, 1938

=== Mérida ===
- Casa Kaan, Centro, Mérida, Yucatán
- Casa Nacira, Mérida, Yucatán
- Edificio Las Monjas, Mérida, Yucatán
- Edificio la Nacional, Mérida, Yucatán
- Estacionamiento Alcázar (parking garage, formerly Cine Alcázar), Mérida, Yucatán
- Facultad de Medicina, Universidad Autónoma de Yucatán, Mérida, Yucatán
- Lux Perpetua Art Centre, Itzimná, Mérida, Yucatán
- Mega Elektra Cantarell Mérida commercial building, Mérida, Yucatán
- Teatro Armando Manzanero (formerly Cine Mérida), Mérida, Yucatán

=== Mexico City ===
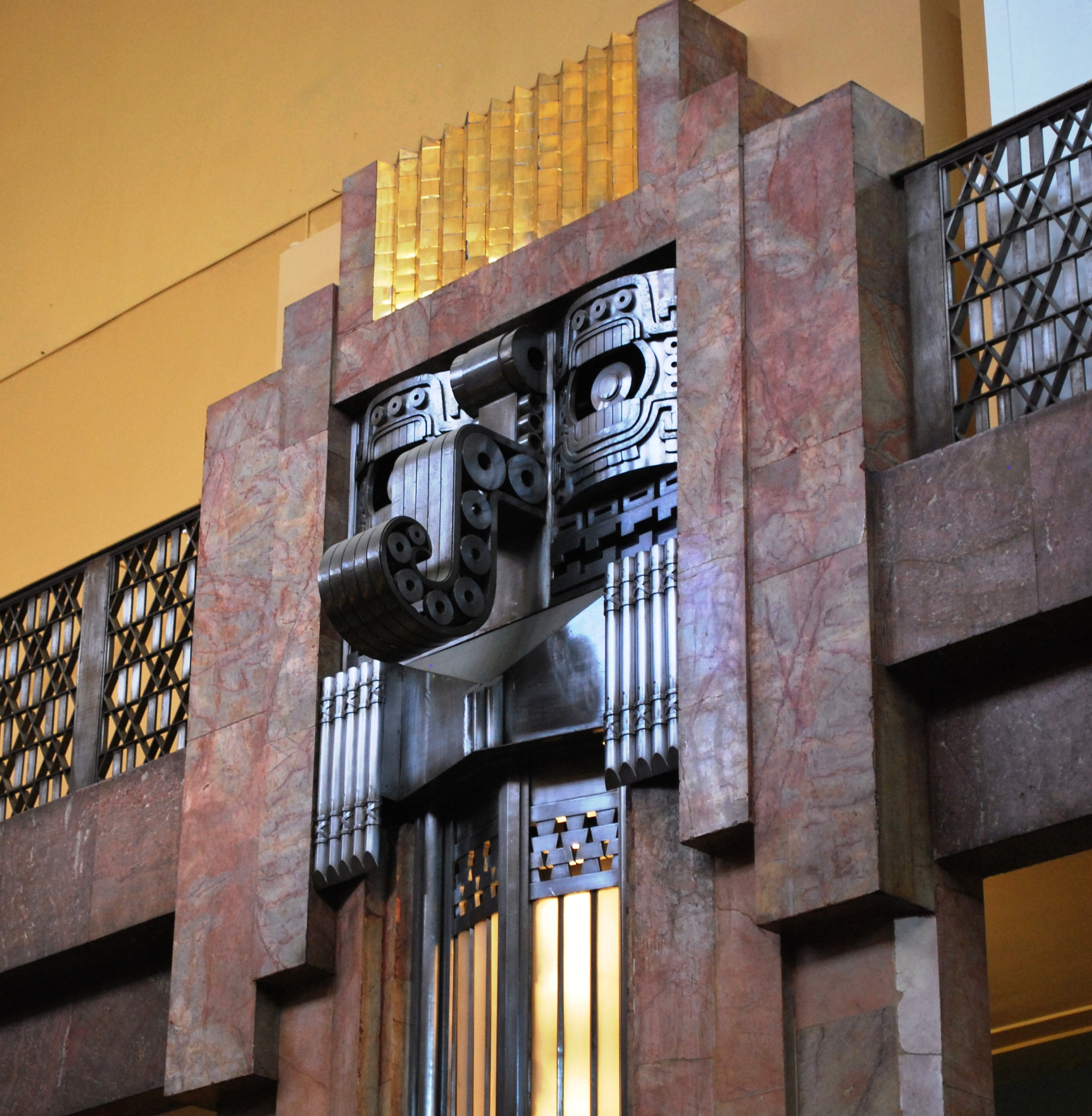
Decorative figure based on Maya design at the Palacio de Bellas Artes in Mexico City, Mexico

- Abelardo L. Rodríguez Market, Mexico City, 1934
- Ámsterdam Avenue, Condesa, Mexico City, 1920s
- Anahuac Building, Colonia Roma, Mexico City, 1932
- Apartamentos Tissot, Condesa, Mexico City
- Avenida 16 de Septiembre no.39 commercial building, Mexico City
- Basurto Building, Condesa, Mexico City, 1945
- Centro Cultural Bella Época (Cine Lido), Condesa, Mexico City, 1942
- Cine Ópera, Colonia San Rafael, Mexico City, 1949
- Centrocel Teresa (formerly Cine Teresa), Mexico City, 1942
- Colonia Condesa, a neighborhood in Mexico City, including most buildings and Parque México (Francisco Serrano, 1939–1942)
- Corcuera Building, Mexico City, 1934
- Cosmos Building, Centro Historico, Mexico City
- Edificio Casas Jardines, Condesa, Mexico City, 1930
- Edificio Guardiola, Cuauhtémoc, Mexico City, 1947
- Edificio El Moro, Lotería Nacional (National Lottery Building), Cuauhtémoc, Mexico City
- Edificio La Nacional, Sears headquarters. Mexico City, 1937
- Edificio Rosa, Condesa, Mexico City, 1935
- Edificio San Antonio, Condesa, Mexico City
- Ermita Building, Tacubaya, Mexico City, 1930
- Frontón México, Jai Alai House, Concerts & Casino, Mexico City, 1929
- Hippodrome Hotel (formerly Tehuacán Building), Condesa, Mexico City, 1931
- Lux Building, Condesa, Mexico City, 1931
- México Building, Condesa, Mexico City, 1932
- Mexico City Mexico Temple, Mexico City, 1983
- Miguel E. Abed II Building, Mexico City, 1940
- Monument to Cuitláhuac, Mexico City, 1964
- Monumento a la Madre (Monument to Motherhood), Mexico City, 1949
- Monumento a la Revolución, Mexico City, 1938
- Museo de Arte Popular (formerly a fire station), Mexico City, 1927
- Niza Building, Condesa, Mexico City, 1934
- Orfeon Theater, Colonia Roma, Mexico City, 1938
- Palacio de Bellas Artes (the opera house), Mexico City, 1904, 1934
- Palacio Chino, Mexico City, 1940
- Palacio de Correos de México, Mexico City, 1907, 1950s
- El Parque Building, Condesa, Mexico City, 1935
- Parque México (Parque San Martín), Mexico City, 1927
- Pasaje Polanco, Polanco, Mexico City, 1938
- Picadilly Building, Condesa, Mexico City, 1930
- Plaza Popocatépetl, Mexico City, 1927
- Rio de Janeiro, Colonia Roma, Mexico City, 1930
- Roxy Building, Condesa, Mexico City, 1934
- Saint Augustine House, Mexico City, 1924
- San Martín Building, Condesa, Mexico City, 1931
- Teatro Metropóitan, Mexico City, 1943
- Telmex building (Teléfonos de México), Centro, Mexico City
- Victoria Building, Condesa, Mexico City
- Viena Building, Condesa, Mexico City

=== Monterrey ===
- Edificio de Correos, Monterey, Nueovo León, 1930
- Escuela Primaria "Presidente Calles", Monterey, Nueovo León,1942
- Hospital Universitario "Dr. José Eleuterio González", Monterey, Nueovo León,1943
- former Palacio Federal, Palacio de Correos, Monterey, Nueovo León, 1928

== Nicaragua ==
- Alcaldía Municipal (City Hall), León, 1935–42
- Montebrisa Boutique Hotel, Matagalpa
- La Colonia Supermarket (Teatro Perla), Matagalpa

== Panama ==
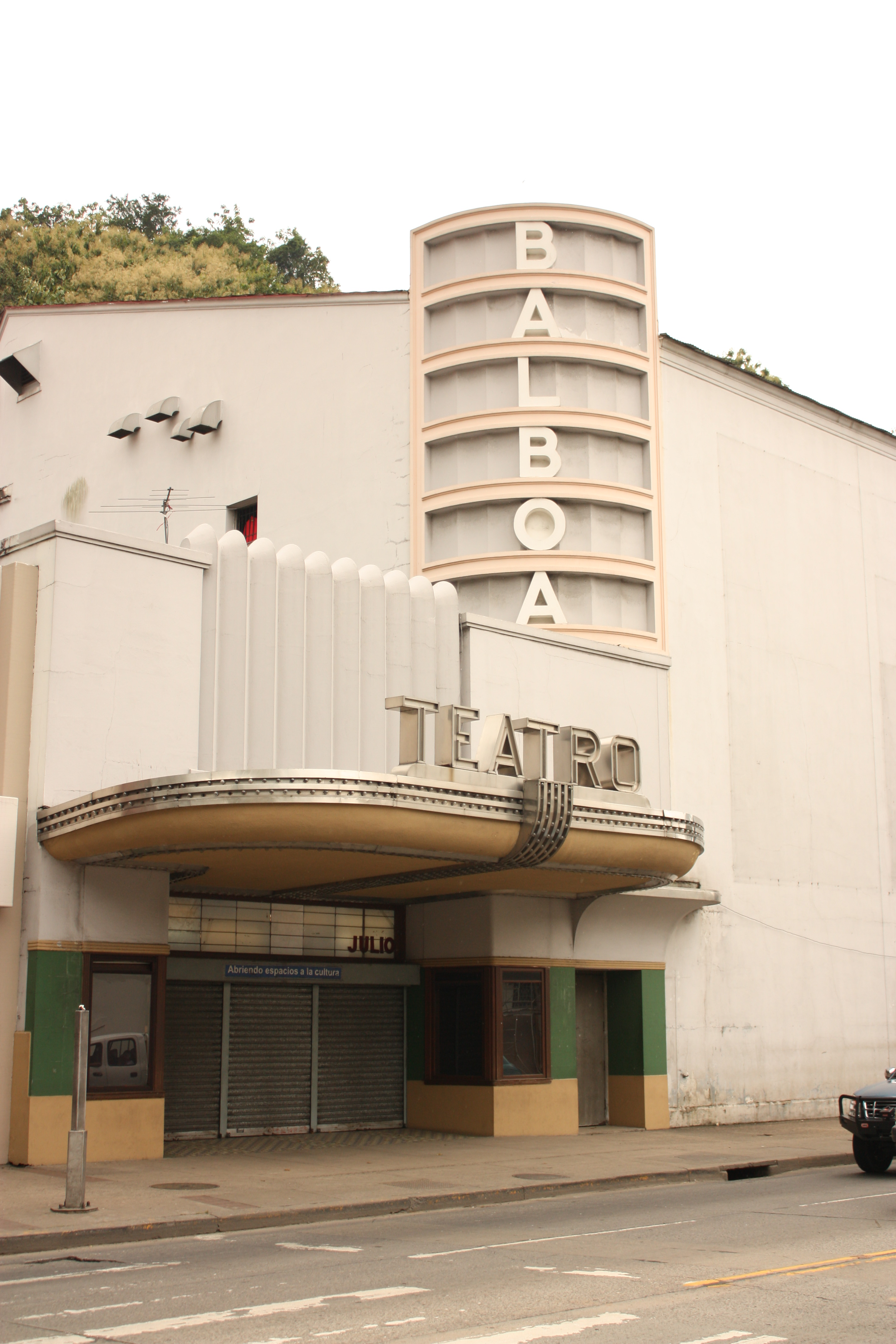
Teatro Balboa, Panama City, Panama

- Banco Nacional de Panamá, Panama City
- Building 104 - Barracks, Panama City, 1933
- Casa Alianza, Panama City
- Casco Viejo Neighborhood, Panama City
- former Duque family house/Casa Art Deco, Panama City
- Fire Station (Cuartel de Bomberos de Colón), Colón
- Hospital Amador Guerrero, Colón
- La Pollera Building, Panama City, 1929
- Teatro Balboa, Panama City, 1946–1950
- Teatro Tropical, Panama City, 1972

== Paraguay ==
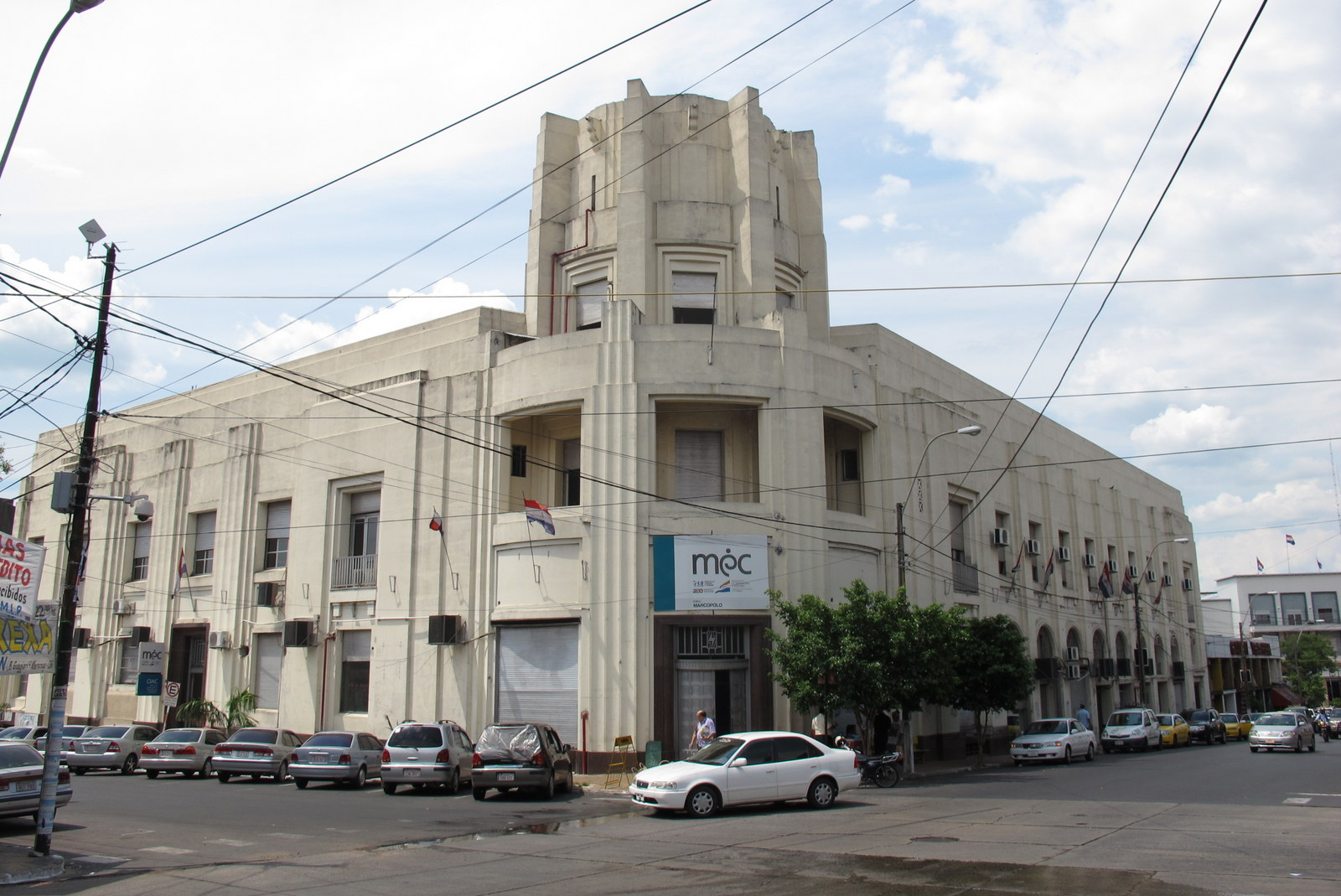
Edificio Marcopolo, Asunción, Paraguay

- former Bank of Paraguay, Asunción, 1944
- Casa Almeida Huerta, Asunción
- Casa Cubas, Asunción
- Casa Martino, Asunción
- Casa Pessolani, Asunción
- Casa Sacarello, Asunción
- Casa Scavone, Asunción
- Edificio Marcopolo, Asunción

== Peru ==
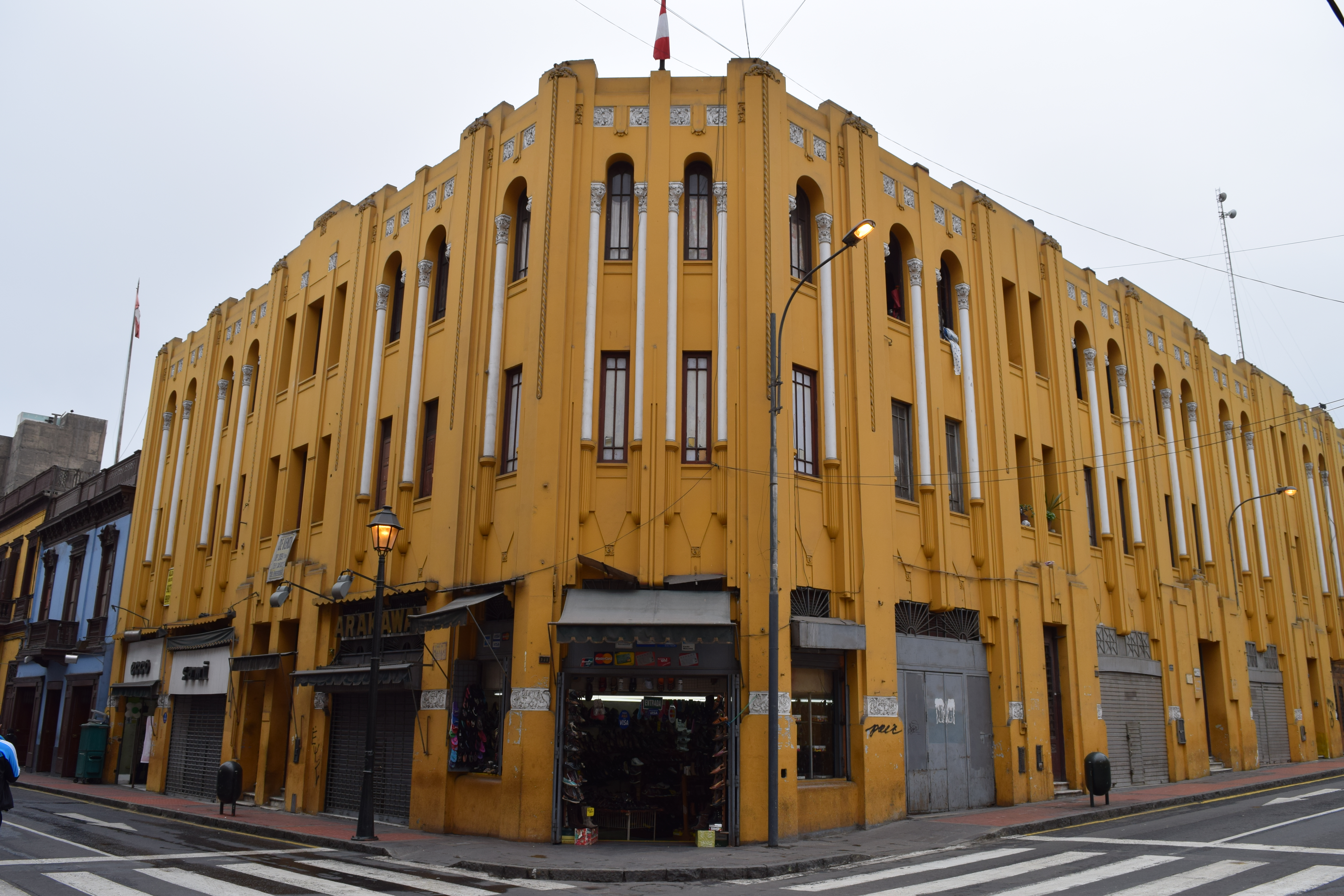
Edificio de Aldabas, Lima, Peru

- 500 Jirón Colón at Paseo Pizarro, Trujillo
- Jerusalén 516, Arequipa
- Mercaderes 120, Arequipa
- Compañía de Bomberos Arequipa 19, Arequipa
- Colegio San Francisco, Arequipa
- Santa Catalina 217, Arequipa
- Portal de Flores 131, Arequipa
- El Ekeko, Arequipa
- Carlos Llosa 201B, Arequipa
- Carlos Llosa 201, Arequipa
- Angamos 211, Arequipa
- Jerusalén 615, Arequipa

=== Lima ===
- Aldabas Building, Azángaro & Huallaga streets (1931)
- Centro Commercial Guizado Hnos. (former toy department of Oeschle department store), Jirón Carabaya 331
- Cine Alfonso Ugarte (formerly Cine Ritz), Avenida Alfonso Ugarte 1437 (late 1930s)
- Compañía Peruana de Teléfonos, Jirón Santa Rosa 153 (1929)
- Company "France" No. 3, Jirón Moquegua 240
- Gildemeister Building, Jirón Azángaro 235 (1930)
- Jesus Nazareno Building (now McDonald's), Union and Santa Rosa streets
- Radio Nacional del Perú, Avenida Petit Thouars 447
- Restaurant De Buen Sabor
- Santa Rosa Building (1931)
- Teatro Británico (ex-Cine Excelsior), Bellavista 527, Miraflores
- Notaria Benavides, Avenida José Pardo 690, Miraflores
- Teatro Marsano, General Suárez 409, Miraflores
- Parroquia San Vicente de Paul, Avenida Angamos Este 651, Surquillo
- Mercado № 1, Paseo de la República and Narciso de la Colina, Surquillo (1940)
- Grau 988, Barranco
- Inka Farma Grau 619, Barranco
- Colina 102, Bellavista District
- Bodega Nakamoto, Ramón Závala 198, Miraflores
- Libertadores 355, San Isidro
- Libertadores 359–365, San Isidro
- Libertadores 455, San Isidro
- Libertadores 674, San Isidro
- Vanderghen 384, San Isidro
- Manuel Fuentes 307, San Isidro
- 1100 La Paz, Miraflores
- 1116 La Paz, Miraflores
- 200 28 de Julio
- Quinta Bolognesi 680–690
- Bolognesi 430, Miraflores
- La Preferida, Julián Arias Aragüez 698, Miraflores
- SBS Libreria Internacional
- Arequipa 4100
- Los Angeles 123–149, Miraflores
- Inca Garcilaso de la Vega 1123
- Camana 286
- Jirón Callao 161
- Jirón Puno 199, Lima
- Arenales 415, Lima
- Republica de Chile 311, Lima
- Paraguay 478, Lima
- Arequipa 3966, Miraflores
- Arequipa 4446, Miraflores
- Atahualpa 650, Miraflores
- Quinta Gral Borgoño 310, Miraflores
- Carlos Acosta 160, San Isidro
- Manuel Fuentes 307, San Isidro
- Bolognesi 277, Miraflores
- Federico Villareal 395, San Isidro
- Tarapca 130, Miraflores
- Arica 154, Miraflores
- Conquistadores 489, Miraflores
- Conquistadores 349, Miraflores
- Conquistadores 125, Miraflores
- Bolivia 666
- Arica 250, Miraflores
- Fanning 479, Miraflores
- Fanning 529, Miraflores
- Fanning 625, Miraflores
- 2398 Petit Thouars
- 1990 Petit Thouars
- 1096 Carabaya
- Edificio Aurich, Pasaje Olaya, Lima
- Ministerio de Relaciones Exteriores
- Tambo de Belen, Lima
- Hospital Militar Central, 1958
- Aeroestacion Limatambo, 1947
- Hospital Obrero de Lima, 1941
- Edificio Buque, Barrios Altos, Lima
- Piura 575, Miraflores
- Chiclayo 229, Miraflores
- Coronel Inclán 494, Miraflores
- Coronel Inclán 484, Miraflores
- Dos de Mayo 689–699, Miraflores
- Arica 110–116, Miraflores
- Groomers Miraflores, Miraflores
- Jorge Chavez 294, Miraflores
- Jorge Chavez 284, Miraflores
- Jose Galvez 698, Miraflores
- Jose Galvez 671, Miraflores
- Jose Galvez 685, Miraflores
- Av. Brasil 1535
- Piura 436, Miraflores
- Av. Arequipa 2932
- Cine Opera, Jesús María
- Parque de la Reserva
- Monumento Fermín Tangüis, Parque de la Reserva
- Grau 405, Miraflores
- Porta 585, Miraflores
- Cordontec, Arequipa Avenue, Lima
- Teatro Roma, Lima
- Iglesia Cristiana Fuente de Gracia, Rímac
- Carlos Tenaud 147–169, Miraflores
- Colon 380, Miraflores
- Colon 391, Miraflores
- Dos de Mayo 864, Miraflores
- Fanning 205, Miraflores
- Fanning 219, Miraflores
- Fanning 410, Miraflores
- Fanning 408, Miraflores
- Fanning 561, Miraflores
- Fanning 426, Miraflores
- Fanning 424, Miraflores
- Fanning 420, Miraflores
- Cantuarias 251, Miraflores
- Santa Teresita del Niño Jesus, Santa Beatriz, Lima
- Escuela Militar de Chorrillos
- La Candelaria, Barranco
- Metro Ovalo Balta, Barranco
- Balta 105, Barranco
- Progreso 10, Barranco
- Progreso 18, Barranco
- Torres Paz 226, Barranco
- San Martin 298, Miraflores
- Ministerio de Salud (1939)
- Cine City Hall, Lima (1946)
- Iglesia Nuestra Señora de los Desamparados, Breña (1945)
- Edificio Tacna, Lima (1949)
- Edificio Ferrand (1947)
- Edificio La Fenix (1948)
- Edificio Raffo, (1938)
- Mercado Central del Callao
- Colegio Militar Leoncio Prado
- Plaza Grau (1946)
- Plaza Jorge Chavez
- Reducto 922, Miraflores
- Reducto 936, Miraflores
- Lampa 1021, Lima

== Puerto Rico ==
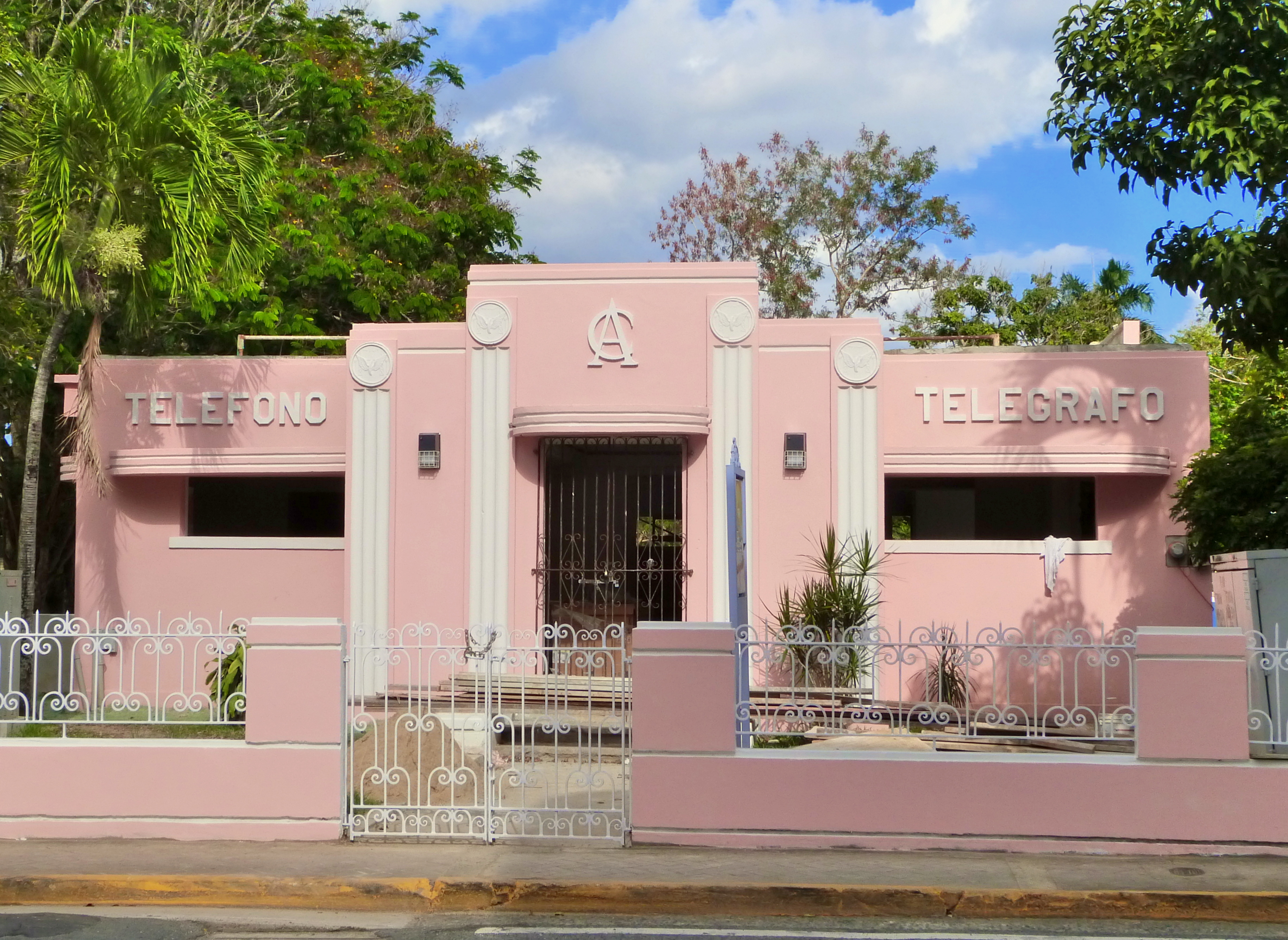
Oficina de Telégrafo y Teléfono, Guaynabo, Puerto Rico

- Aguayo Aldea Vocational High School, Caguas Pueblo, 1939
- Archivo Histórico Municipal (City Historical Archives), Mayagüez
- Banco Popular de Puerto Rico, San Juan, 1938
- Cámara de Comercio de Puerto Rico (formerly a branch of the Federal Land Bank of Baltimore), San Juan, 1926
- Ceiba Fire Station, Ceiba, 1954
- Jacinto Lopez Martinez Grammar School, Dorado, 1925
- Maximiliano Merced Fire Station, Aguas Buenas, 1955
- Mayagüez Main Post Office, Mayagüez, Puerto Rico, 1935
- Oficina de Telégrafo y Teléfono, Guaynabo Pueblo, 1948
- Plaza del Mercado de Manatí, Manatí Pueblo, 1925
- Río Piedras State Penitentiary, Río Piedras, Puerto Rico, 1933
- Teatro Calimano, Guayama
- Teatro Yagüez, Mayagüez, Puerto Rico, 1921
- Yabucoa Fire Station, Yabucoa, 1943

=== Ponce ===
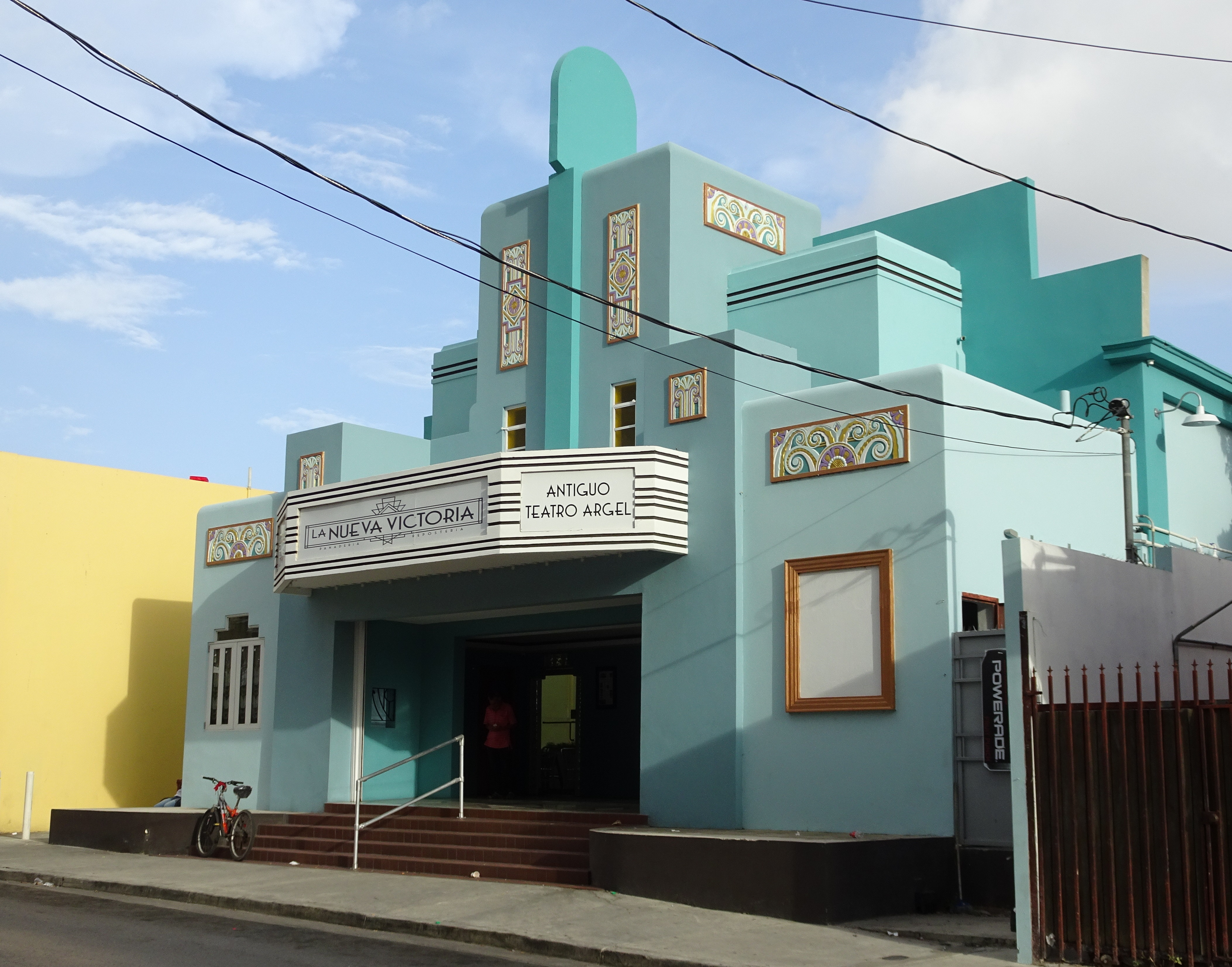
former Teatro Argel (now La Nueva Victoria Panaderia), Ponce, Puerto Rico

- Beatriz Apartments, Ponce Pueblo, Ponce, 1943
- Cementerio Católico San Vicente de Paul, Ponce, Puerto Rico
- Club Náutico de Ponce (Ponce Yacht and Fishing Club), Ponce, 1941
- Concha Acústica de Ponce (Acoustic Shell), Cuarto, Ponce, 1956
- Mercado de las Carnes, Ponce, Puerto Rico, 1926
- Museo Francisco "Pancho" Coimbre, Ponce, Puerto Rico
- Ponce Creole, Ponce, 1920s
- Plaza del Mercado de Ponce, Ponce, Puerto Rico, 1863, 1941
- Teatro Argel (now La Nueva Victoria bakery), Segundo, Ponce, 1940
- Teatro Bélgica, Cuarto, Ponce, 1940
- Teatro Fox Delicias, Segundo, Ponce, Puerto Rico, 1931
- Teatro Hollywood, Primero, Ponce, 1930s
- Teatro Miramar, Playa, Ponce, 1940s
- Teatro Rex, Sexto, Ponce, 1930s
- Teatro Rívoli, Tercero, Ponce, 1909
- Teatro Universal, Segundo, Ponce, 1930s
- Teatro Victoria, Segundo, Ponce, 1930s

=== San Juan ===
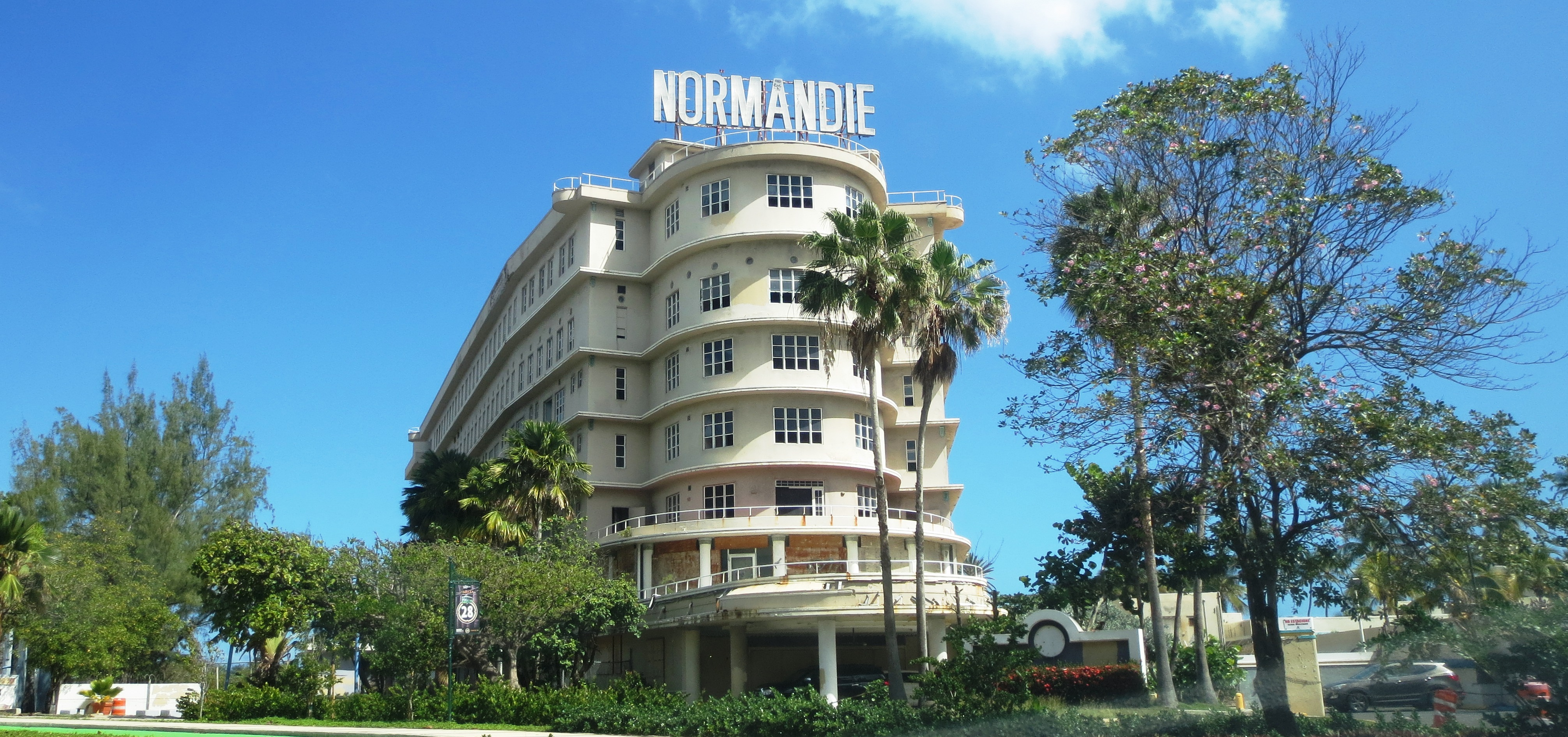
Normandie Hotel, San Juan, Puerto Rico

- Auditorio Salvador Brau, San Juan, 1949
- Banco Popular Building, Antiguo, San Juan, 1939
- Department of Agriculture Building, Santurce, San Juan, 1941
- Department of Agriculture Autoridad de Tierras building, Santurce, San Juan
- Edificio Aboy "Le Faro," Santurce, San Juan, 1937
- Edificio del Telégrafo, Santurce, San Juan, 1947
- El Falansterio de Puerta de Tierra apartments, San Juan Antiguo, Puerto Rico
- Figueroa Apartments, Santurce, San Juan, 1935
- Martín Peña Bridge, San Juan, Puerto Rico, 1939
- Miami Building, San Juan, Puerto Rico, 1936
- Normandie Hotel, San Juan, Puerto Rico, 1942
- Telegraph Building, Santurce, San Juan, Puerto Rico
- University High School, Río Piedras, San Juan, 1939
- U.S. Post Office Fernández Juncos, Santurce, San Juan

== Suriname ==
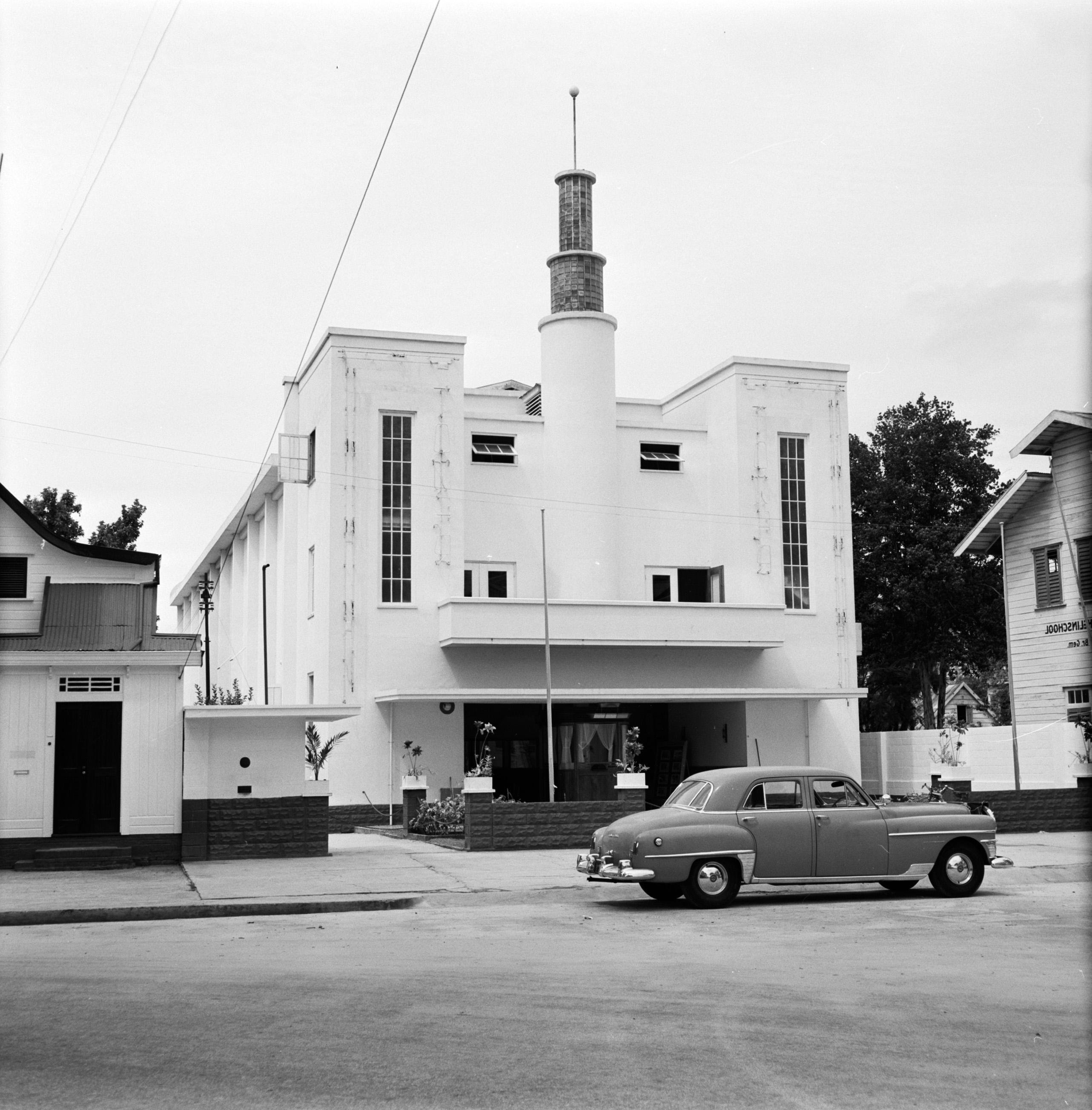
Bioscoop Tower, Paramaribo, Suriname

- Bioscoop Tower, Paramaribo, 1948

== Trinidad & Tobago ==
- Citigroup Building, San Fernando, Trinidad and Tobago
- Police Administration Building, San Fernando, Trinidad and Tobago
- Standards Building, San Fernando, Trinidad and Tobago
- Treasury Building, Port-of-Spain, 1938

== Uruguay ==
- Cine Helvético, Nueva Helvecia, 1955
- Cine Teatro Plaza, Flores, 1957
- Club Uruguay, Rivera, 1942
- Edificio del Banco Hipotecario, Rocha, 1954
- El Planeta Palace Hotel, Atlántida, 1937
- Escuela N°262 Colonia de Vacaciones, Malvín, 1936
- Estación Fariña, Punta del Este, 1950
- Hotel Escorial, Piriápolis
- La Floresta Hotel, Floresta, 1937
- Museo Agustín Araújo (formerly Cine Teatro Municipal), Treinta y Tres, 1930
- Pabellón de las Rosas, Piriápolis, 1933
- Teatro Artigas, Trinidad, 1913
- Teatro Uamá, Carmelo, 1928

=== Montevideo ===
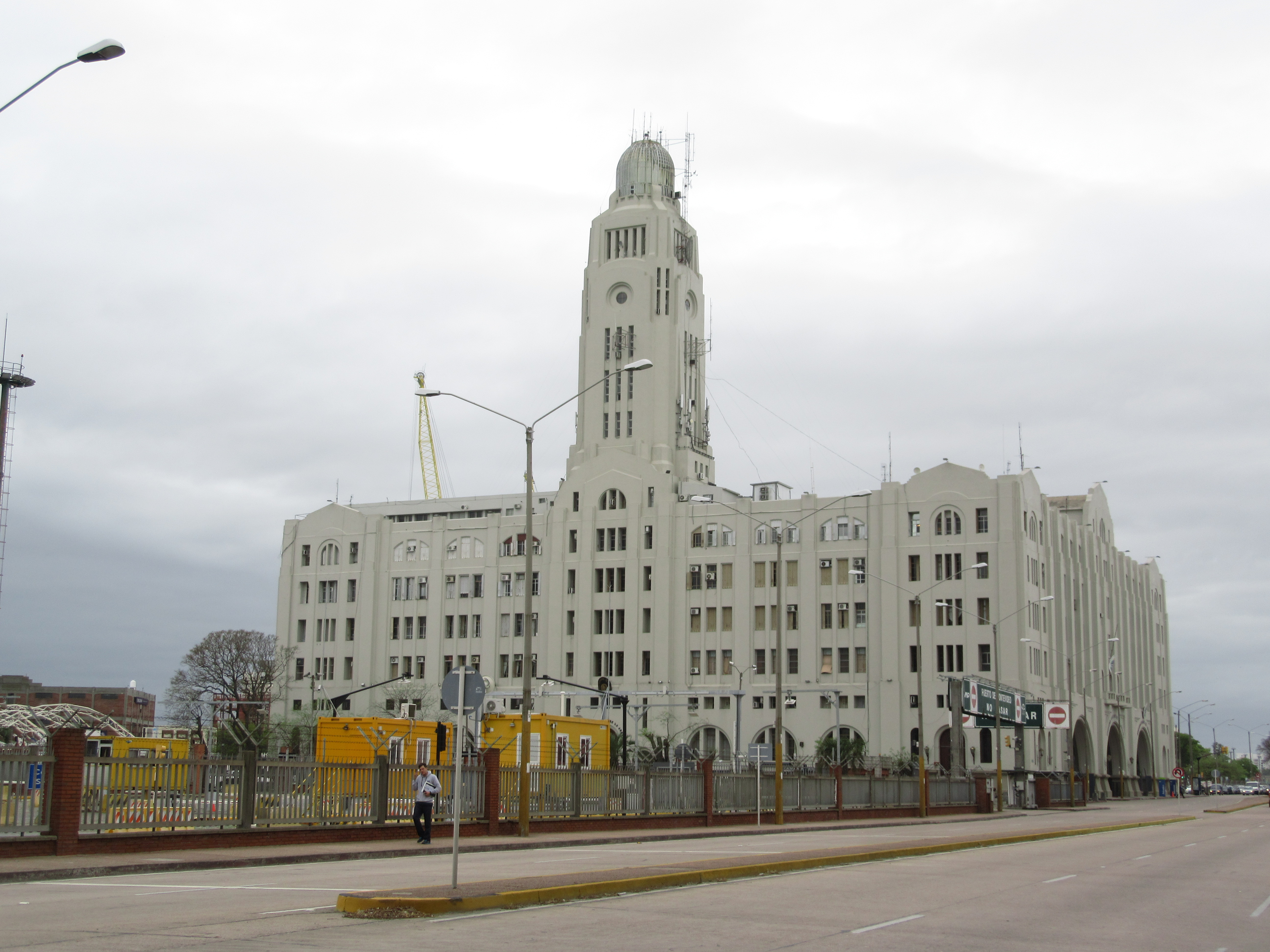
Dirección Nacional de Aduanas, Montevideo, Uruguay

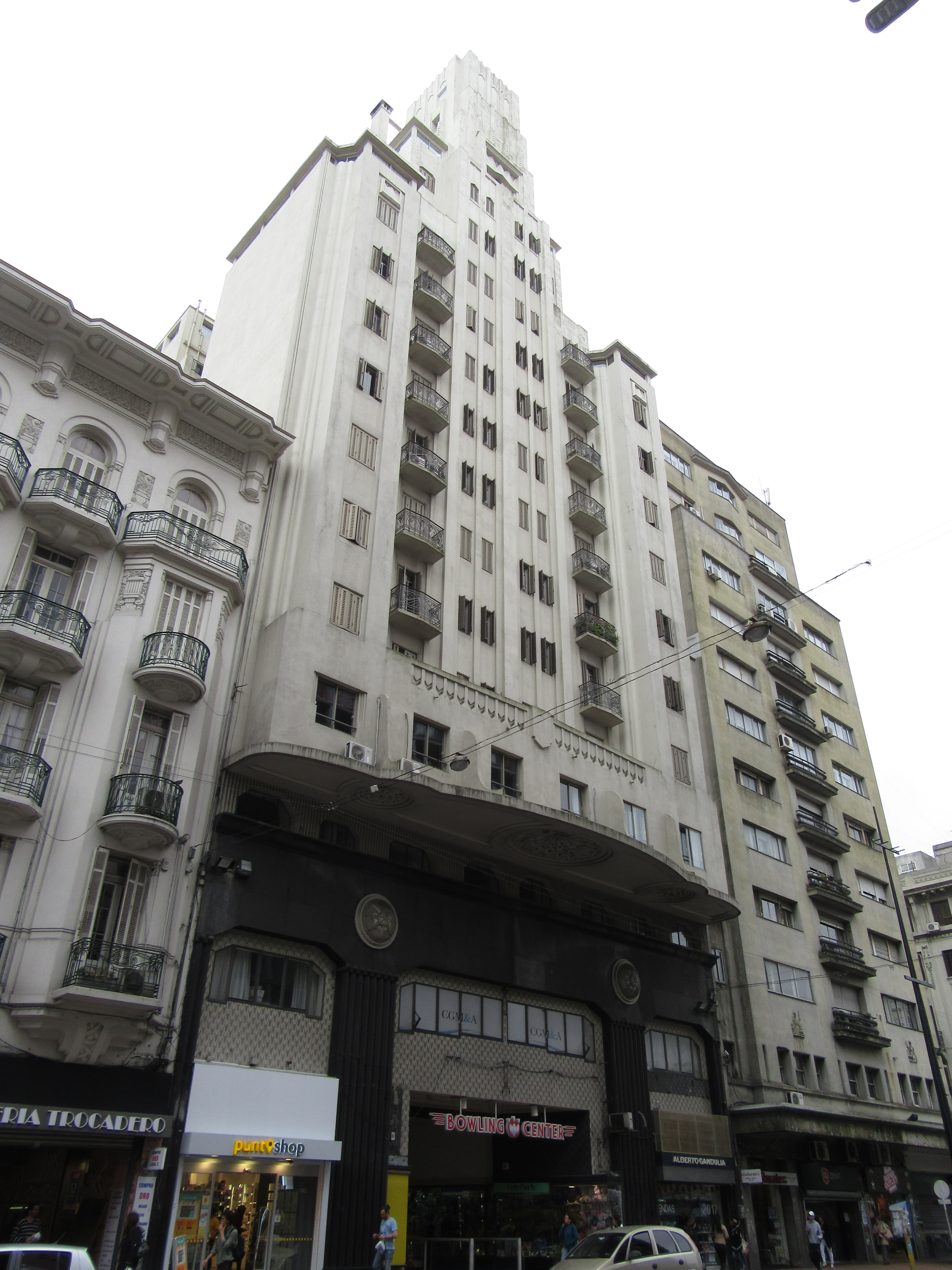
Palacio Díaz, Montevideo, Uruguay

- Agrimensor Germán Barbato Planetarium, Montevideo, 1955
- Artigas Building, Montevideo, 1940
- Ateneo Popular, Montevideo, 1925
- Auditorio Nelly Goitiño, Montevideo, 1949
- Banco de la Caja Obrera, Montevideo, 1939
- Banco Santander (formerly Banco Holandés de Uruguay), Montevideo, 1940
- Barella apartments, Montevideo
- Bar España, Montevideo
- Cabildo Galería de Arte, Montevideo
- Café Rosedal, Montevideo
- Calle Juan Carlos Gomez 1388, Montevideo, 1931
- Casa Barth, Montevideo, 1925
- Centro de Almaceneros Minoristas, Montevideo
- Centro Cultural Artesano, Montevideo
- Centro de Fotografía de Montevideo (Photography Center, formerly Bazar Mitre), Montevideo, 1931
- Cine Ambassador, Montevideo
- Cine Radio City, Montevideo, 1937
- Cine Trocadero, Montevideo, 1945
- Comando General de la Armada, Montevideo
- Don Boutique Hôtel, Montevideo
- Edificio Centenario, Montevideo
- Edificio de los Consejos de Salario (formerly Ministerio de Instrucción Pública y Previsión Social and Edificio Juncal), Montevideo, 1930s
- Edificio de la Dirección Nacional de Aduanas (Customs Building), Montevideo, 1923
- Edificio Goyret, Montevideo
- Edificio El Indio, Montevideo, 1949
- Edificio Magallanes, Montevideo
- Edificio Mercosur (formerly Edificio Parque Hotel Casino), Montevideo
- Edificio San Felipe y Santiago, Montevideo, 1941
- Edificio San José, Montevideo
- Estadio Centenario, Montevideo, 1930
- Faculda de de Medicina, Montevideo
- Fundación Cravotto (“Kalinen” former Casa Mauricio Cravotto), Montevideo, 1930s
- Galeria Florida, Montevideo
- Garaje Central de la Asistencia Pública Nacional, Montevideo
- Garaje Cerrito, Montevideo
- Hospital Banco de Seguros del Estado emergency entrance building, Montevideo
- Hospital Clinic Manuel Quintela, Montevideo
- Hotel Aramaya, Montevideo
- Hotel Bristol, Carrasco, 1925
- Hotel Don, Mercado del Puerto, Montevideo, 1929
- Jockey Club, restaurant Montevideo, 1932
- Kioscos policiales, Montevideo, 1940
- Lapido Building, Montevideo, 1933
- Liceo N° 49 Virgilio Scarabelli, Montevideo
- Lux Building, Montevideo
- El Mástil Building, Pocitos, Montevideo, 1935
- McLean Building, Montevideo, 1931
- Mercado Modelo, Montevideo, 1937
- Museo del Azulejo (Tile Museum), Montevideo, 1931
- Palacio Díaz, Montevideo, 1929
- Palacio Durazno, Montevideo, 1930s
- Palacio Maggiolo, Montevideo
- Palacio Rinaldi, Montevideo, 1929
- Palacios Rodó y Sarmiento, Montevideo
- Palacio Salvo, Montevideo, 1928
- Palacio de la Cerveza (formerly Palacio Sudamerica), Montevideo, 1927
- Parma Building, Montevideo
- Plaza Independencia area, Montevideo
- National Police of Uruguay, Montevideo
- Proamar Building, Montevideo, 1940
- La Ronda Cafe, Montevideo
- Tapié Building, Montevideo, 1934
- Templo Adventista, Montevideo
- Velódromo Municipal de Montevideo, Montevideo
- Yacht Club Uruguayo, Montevideo, 1939

== Venezuela ==
=== Barquisimeto ===
- Altagracia Market, Barquisimeto, 1936
- Bella Vista Market, Barquisimeto, 1936
- Bolívar Building, Barquisimeto, 1940s
- Cine Imperio, Barquisimeto, 1943
- Cine Rialto, Barquisimeto, 1943
- El Manteco Market, Barquisimeto, 1936
- El Tocuyo Building, Barquisimeto, 1949
- Embotelladora Astor, Barquisimeto, 1938
- Municipal Slaughterhouse, Barquisimeto, 1938
- Sr. Soteldo Building, Barquisimeto, 1940s
- Studebaker Building, Barquisimeto, 1948

=== Caracas ===
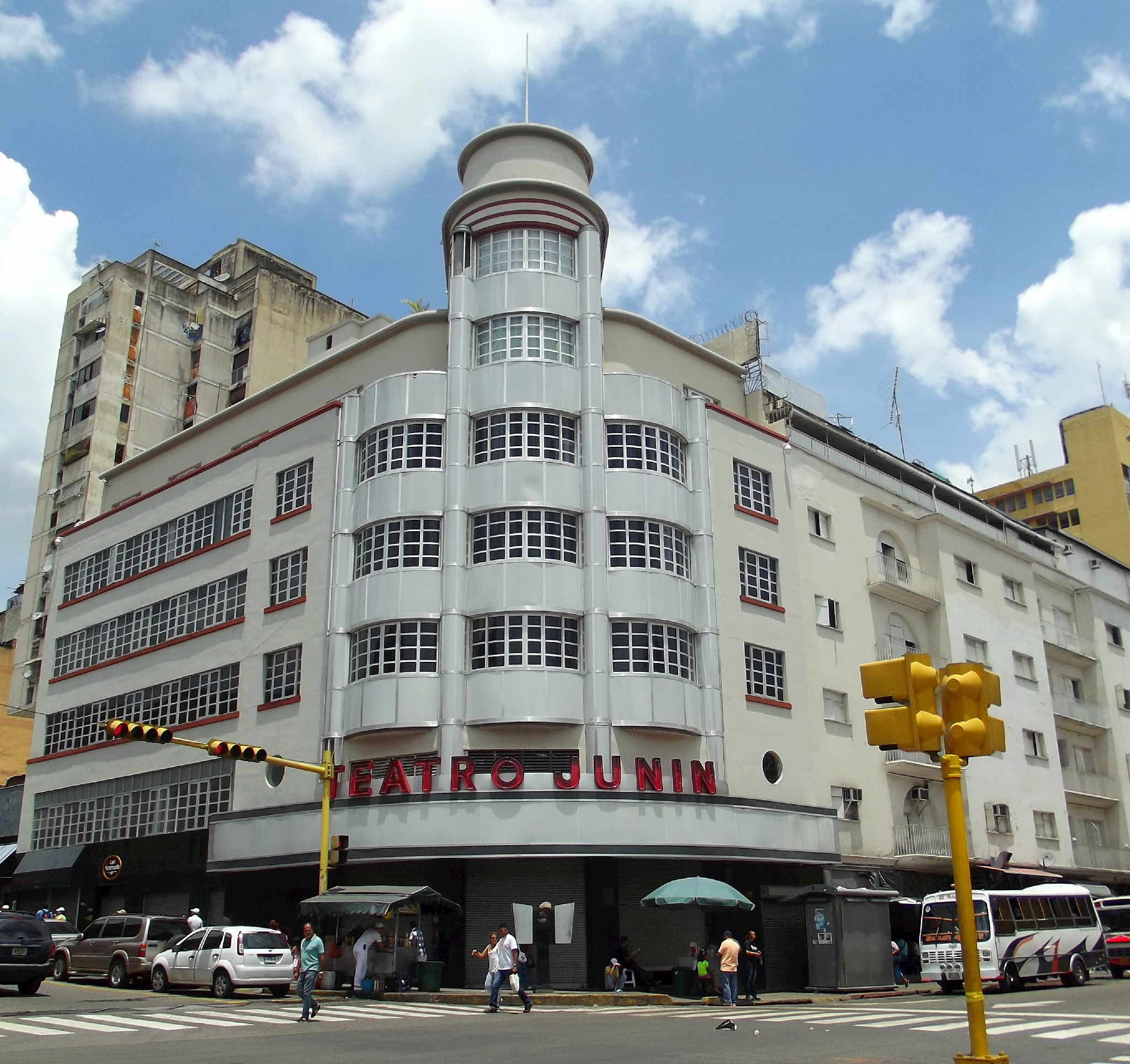
Teatro Junín, Caracas, Venezuela

Public & Private Works

- Almacenes El Pan Grande, Caracas, 1927-1940s
- Ambos Mundos Building, 1945
- Banco Agrícola y Pecuario, Caracas, 1931
- Bank of Venezuela El Recreo Agency Building, Caracas, 1948
- Beco Blohm Building, Caracas, 1948
- Capilla Jesús, María y José, Caracas, 1940s
- Caracas Building, Caracas, 1950s
- Casa Belga Building, Caracas, 1928
- Central Bank of Venezuela Building, Caracas, 1946–1960
- Centro Médico de Caracas, Caracas, 1947
- Cervecería Caracas Building, Caracas, 1940s
- Chacaito Gas Station, Caracas, 1948–1955
- Cine America, Caracas, 1940–1969
- Cine Apolo, Caracas, 1944–1983
- Cine Aquiles Nazoa, Caracas, 1951
- Cine Baby, Caracas, 1943
- Cine Bolívar, Caracas, 1929
- Cine Continental, Caracas, 1936
- Cine El Dorado, Caracas, 1929
- Cine El Encanto, Caracas, 1940
- Cine El Prado, Caracas, 1948
- Cine Granada, Caracas, 1940s
- Cine Hollywood, Caracas, 1941
- Cine Jardines, Caracas, 1943–1980
- Cine La Vega, Caracas, 1951
- Cine Lidice, Caracas, 1948
- Cine Lincoln, Caracas, 1951
- Cine Lux, Caracas, 1943
- Cine Para Ti, Caracas, 1949
- Cine Plaza, Caracas, 1940
- Cine Reforma, Caracas, 1952
- Cine Rex, Caracas, 1936
- Cine Roxy, Caracas, 1940–1960
- Cine Royal, Caracas, 1943
- Club Alemán, Caracas, 1935
- Colegio Cervantes, Caracas, 1950s
- Colegio José Ramón Camejo, Caracas, 1940s
- Colegio San Ignacio, Caracas, 1940
- Colimodio Building, Caracas, 1949
- Cuartel Central de Bomberos, Caracas, 1937–1952
- Escuela Experimental de Venezuela, Caracas, 1939
- Escuela Gran Colombia, Caracas, 1939
- Eugenio Mendoza & Cía Sucrs Office Building, Caracas, 1940
- Galerías Perico Building, Caracas, 1940s
- Galileo Building, Caracas, 1940s
- Garaje Bolívar, Caracas, 1927?
- General Páez Building, 1949
- Hospital Militar y Naval, Caracas, 1937
- Hotel El Conde, Caracas, 1948
- Hotel Nacional, Caracas, 1947
- Hotel Potomac, Caracas, 1949
- Hotel Waldorf, Caracas, 1944
- Jefatura Civil Parroquia Santa Teresa, Caracas, 1930–1952
- Karam Building, Caracas, 1949
- La Francia Building, Caracas, 1946
- Las Acacias Bridge, Caracas, 1941
- Las Mercedes Bridge, Caracas, 1941
- Las Mercedes Building, Caracas, 1943
- Manhattan Building, Caracas, 1946
- Maternidad Concepción Palacios, Caracas, 1938
- Meat Market El Conde, Caracas, 1936-1950s
- Ministerio de Fomento, Caracas, 1935
- Mohedano Gas Station, Caracas, 1944–1950
- New Annex El Recreo Agency Building, Caracas, 1952
- Nº22 Building, Caracas, 1944
- Pabellón del Hipódromo Nacional de El Paraíso, Caracas, 1931
- Palacio de Educación Nacional, Caracas, 1936
- Palacio de la Gobernación, Caracas, 1934
- Pan American Building, Caracas, 1951
- Panificadora Building, Caracas, 1940s
- Pasaje Junín Building, Caracas, 1942–1948
- Phelps Building, Caracas, 1946
- Planta Embotelladora de Pepsi, Caracas, 1940
- Porta Astas de Campo Alegre, Caracas, 1932
- Puente República Building, Caracas, 1945
- Sanatorio Antituberculoso El Algodonal, Caracas, 1939
- Slaughterhouse Petare, Caracas, 1930s-1937
- Teatro Alameda, Caracas, 1943
- Teatro Ávila, Caracas, 1939
- Teatro Boyacá, Caracas, 1940–1969
- Teatro Catia, Caracas, 1940
- Teatro El Pinar, Caracas, 1947
- Teatro Junín, Caracas, 1950
- Teatro Las Acacias, Caracas, 1946
- Teatro Pimentel, Caracas, 1930
- Teatro Radio City, Caracas, 1953
- Teatro Simón Bolívar, Caracas, 1943–2010
- Teatro Venezuela, Caracas, 1949
- Teatro Principal, Caracas, 1931
- Veroes Building, Caracas, 1940
- Victor Mendozza Building, Caracas, 1945
- Workshop Building, Caracas, 1940s
- Workshop Building, Caracas, 1940s
- Zingg Building, Caracas, 1940

Residential Works

- Acapulco Building, 1940s
- Albion Building, 1940s
- Alcabala Building, 1940s
- Aldomar Building, 1940s
- Alfaterna Building, Caracas, 1954
- Amagrazia Building, 1940s
- Andrés Bello Building, 1940s
- Andrey Building, 1940s
- Aragua Building, 1940s
- Aralar Building, 1950
- Archanda Building, 1940s
- Arno Building, 1940s
- Aryola Building, 1940s
- Asunción Building, 1940s
- Augustus Building, 1940s
- Avila Building, 1940s
- Avila Building, 1940s
- Avila Building, 1940s
- Avila Building, 1940s
- Ávila Building, 1940s
- Ayacucho Building, 1940s
- Bellas Artes Building, 1940s
- Bretaña Building, 1940s
- Brisas de Gamboa Building, 1940s
- Building 5 Altamira, 1947
- Caicara Building, 1940
- Campo Elías Building, 1940s
- Candilito Building, 1940s
- Cantaura Building, 1940s
- Caracas Building, 1940s
- Cesare Building, 1940s
- Che-co Building, 1940s
- Cibeles & Embajadores Building, 1940s
- Compostela Building, 1940s
- Concordia Building, 1940s
- Copacabana Building, 1940s
- Dolores Building, 1940s
- El Águila Building, 1940s
- El Bosque Building, 1940s
- El Cesar Building, 1940s
- El Condado Building, 1940s
- El Cordero Building, 1940s
- El Hoyo Building, 1940s
- El Lago Building, 1940s
- El Paradero Building, 1940s
- El Sordo Building, 1940s
- El Sorpel Building, 1940s
- El Taladro Building, 1940s
- El Trabajo Building, 1940s
- Empire Building, 1940s
- Esmirna Building, 1940s
- Esquina Calero Building, 1940s
- Este Building, 1940s
- Evelyn Building, 1940s
- Excelsior Building, 1940s
- Felipe Lemmo Building, 1940s
- Fernandez Building, 1940s
- Ferrenquín Building, 1940s
- Ferrer Building, 1940s
- Fortuna Building, 1940s
- García Building, 1940s
- Gobernador Building, 1940s
- Gradillas Building, 1952
- Granaderos Building, 1940s
- Guadalupana Building, 1940s
- Ivan Building, 1940s
- Jay Ros Building, 1940s
- Jerez Building, 1940s
- José Félix Ribas Building, 1940s
- Joselito Building, 1940s
- La Campiña Building I, 1940s
- La Campiña Building II, 1940s
- La Candelaria Building, 1944
- Las Brisas Building, 1940s
- Las Piedras Building, 1940s
- Libertador Building, 1940
- Lincoln Building, 1940s
- Logroño & Rioja Building, 1940s
- López Gómez Building, 1940s
- Loreto Building, 1940s
- Madrid Building, 1940s
- Málaga Building, 1940s
- Manduca Building, 1940s
- Marbor Building, 1940s
- Marconi & Codazzi Building, 1940s
- Maury Building, 1940s
- Mawdsley Building, 1940s
- Mercaderes Building, 1942
- Mereyal Building, 1940s
- Mérida Building, 1940s
- Miguelacho Building, 1940s
- Milagro Building, 1940s
- Montealegre Building, 1940s
- N2 Building, 1940s
- N5 Building, 1940s
- Ñaurali Building, 1940s
- Navarra Building, 1940s
- Nevada Building, 1940s
- Nº1 Building, 1940s
- Nº2 Building, 1940s
- Nº3 Building, 1940s
- Nº4 Building, 1940s
- Nº5 Building, 1940s
- Nº6 Building, 1940s
- Nº20 Building, 1940s
- Nº23 Building, 1940s
- Nº28 Building, 1940s
- Nº36 Building, 1940s
- Nº36 Building, 1940s
- Nº38 Building, 1940s
- Nº102 Building, 1940s
- Nº140 Building, 1940s
- Nº216 Building, 1940s
- Óptimo Building, 1940s
- Oriente Building, 1940s
- Orinoco Building, 1940s
- Orleans Building, 1940s
- Padre Sierra Building, 1949
- Pepito Building, 1940s
- Piar Building, 1940s
- Pinto Building, 1940s
- Poldor Building, 1940s
- Puente República Building, 1940s
- Puente Yanés, 1946
- Punceres Building, 1940s
- Québec & Perico Building, 1940s
- Ramca Building, 1940
- Romot Building, 1940s
- Rocco Building, 1940s
- Rubén Gómez Building, 1940s
- Sady Building, 1940s
- San Andrés Building, 1940s
- San Antonio Building, 1940s
- San Bosco Building, 1940s
- San Felipe Building, 1940s
- San Felix Building, 1951
- San Francesco Building, 1951
- San José Building, 1940s
- San Lorenz Building, 1940s
- San Luis Building, 1940s
- San Luis Building, 1940s
- Santa Clara Building, 1940s
- Santo Domingo Building, 1940s
- Silco Building, 1940
- Sonia Building, 1940s
- Sosa Building, 1940s
- Sorel Building, 1940s
- Tablitas Building, 1940s
- Teñidero Building, 1940s
- Tracabordo Building, 1940s
- Tritone Building, 1940s
- Universal Building, 1940s
- Untitled Building, 1940s
- Untitled Building, 1940s
- Untitled Building, 1940s
- Untitled Building, 1940s
- Untitled Building, 1940s
- Untitled Building, 1940s
- Untitled Building, 1940s
- Untitled Building, 1940s
- Untitled Building, 1940s
- Untitled Building, 1940s
- Untitled Building, 1940s
- Untitled Building, 1940s
- Untitled Building, 1940s
- Untitled Building, 1940s
- Untitled Building, 1940s
- Untitled Building, 1940s
- Untitled Building, 1940s
- Urdaneta Building, 1940s
- Veroes Building, 1940
- Vilco Building, 1940s
- Zarikan Building, Caracas, 1953
- Ziade Building, 1940s

Houses

- Carmigrady House, Caracas, 1940s
- Emizoma & La Paz Houses, Caracas, 1940s
- House Nº12, Caracas, 1940s
- Ingenuo House, Caracas, 1944
- Lilia House, Caracas, 1940s
- Magally House, Caracas, 1940s
- Maraux House, Caracas, 1940s
- Maria House, Caracas, 1940s
- Mercedes House, Caracas, 1940s
- Mi Viejo House, Caracas, 1940s
- Nina House, Caracas, 1940s
- Nubia House, Caracas, 1940s
- Primavera House, Caracas, 1937
- Roamar House, Caracas, 1940s
- Untitled House, Caracas, 1940s
- Untitled House, Caracas, 1940s
- Untitled House, Caracas, 1940s
- Untitled House, Caracas, 1940s
- Untitled House, Caracas, 1940s
- Untitled House, Caracas, 1940s
- Untitled House, Caracas, 1940s
- Untitled House, Caracas, 1940s
- Untitled House, Caracas, 1940s
- Untitled House, Caracas, 1940s
- Untitled House, Caracas, 1940s
- Villa Aurora, Caracas, 1950s
- Yrma House, Caracas, 1940s

=== Maracaibo ===
- Banco Agrícola y Pecuario Building, Maracaibo, 1939
- B.O.D Old Building, Maracaibo, 1930s
- Café Imperial, Maracaibo, 1930s
- Cámara de Comercio, Maracaibo, 1946
- Cine Boyacá, Maracaibo, 1940s
- Cine Estrella, Maracaibo, 1940s
- Cine Imperio, Maracaibo, 1948
- Cine Paramount, Maracaibo, 1951
- Cine Teatro Paraíso, Maracaibo, 1940–1960
- Colegio Nuestra Señora de Chiquinquirá, Maracaibo, 1944
- Ekmeiro Building, Maracaibo, 1930s
- El Automóvil Universal Building, Maracaibo, 1950
- Escuela de Medicina (LUZ), Maracaibo, 1945
- Escuela Pública de Varones (Idelfonso Vásquez), Maracaibo, 1929
- Estadio Olímpico Alejandro Borges, Maracaibo, 1945
- Farmacia Pasteur, Maracaibo, 1930s
- Hotel Victoria, Maracaibo, 1932
- Iglesia Las Mercedes, Maracaibo, 1948
- Iglesia San José, Maracaibo, 1947
- La Casa Eléctrica, Maracaibo, 1930s
- La Ferretería Universal, Maracaibo, 1930s
- La Suiza Building, Maracaibo, 1936
- Liceo Udón Pérez, Maracaibo, 1930s
- Pasaje Universal Building, Maracaibo, 1930s
- Plaza de la República, Maracaibo, 1945
- Radio Ondas del Lago Building, Maracaibo, 1930s
- Seguro Social Building, Maracaibo, 1930s
- Standard Motor Company Building, Maracaibo, 1937
- Teatro Baralt, Maracaibo, 1932
- Zulia Motors Building, Maracaibo, 1951

=== Maracay ===
- Baños Zoológico de Las Delicias, Maracay, 1928
- Cárcel Pública de Alayón, Maracay, 1937
- Cervecería Llanera Building, Maracay, 1930s
- Cine Aragua, Maracay, 1930s
- Cine Royal, Maracay, 1930s
- Cine Maracay, Maracay, 1930s
- Cine Tropical, Maracay, 1930s
- Comercial Building, Maracay, 1930s
- Cuartel Páez, Maracay, 1930
- Hospital Civil, Maracay, 1930
- Hotel Jardín, Maracay, 1930
- Hotel Rancho Grande, Maracay, 1933-Inconclused
- House Organización Gnosis, Maracay, 1930s
- La Plaza Tacarigua, Maracay, 1933
- La Primavera Cemetery, Maracay, 1930s
- Liceo Militar Libertador, Maracay, 1937
- Teatro Ateneo, Maracay, 1926
- Teatro de la Ópera, Maracay, 1932
- Tejero Family House, Maracay, 1931
- Telares de Maracay, Maracay, 1926
- Villa Cristina House, Maracay, 1934
- Untitled Building, Maracay, 1940s
- Untitled Building, Maracay, 1940s
- Untitled Building, Maracay, 1940s
- Untitled House, Maracay, 1930s
- Untitled House, Maracay, 1930s
- Untitled House, Maracay, 1930s
- Untitled House, Maracay, 1930s
- Untitled House, Maracay, 1930s
- Workshop Building, Maracay, 1940s
- Workshop Building, Maracay, 1940s
- Workshop Building, Maracay, 1940s
- Workshop Building, Maracay, 1940s
- Workshop Building, Maracay, 1940s
- Workshop Building, Maracay, 1940s

== See also ==
- List of Art Deco architecture
- Art Deco topics
- Streamline Moderne architecture
