= List of Canadian photojournalists =

This is a list of notable Canadian photojournalists. For photojournalists of other nationalities, see list of photojournalists.

- Louise Abbott (born 1950)

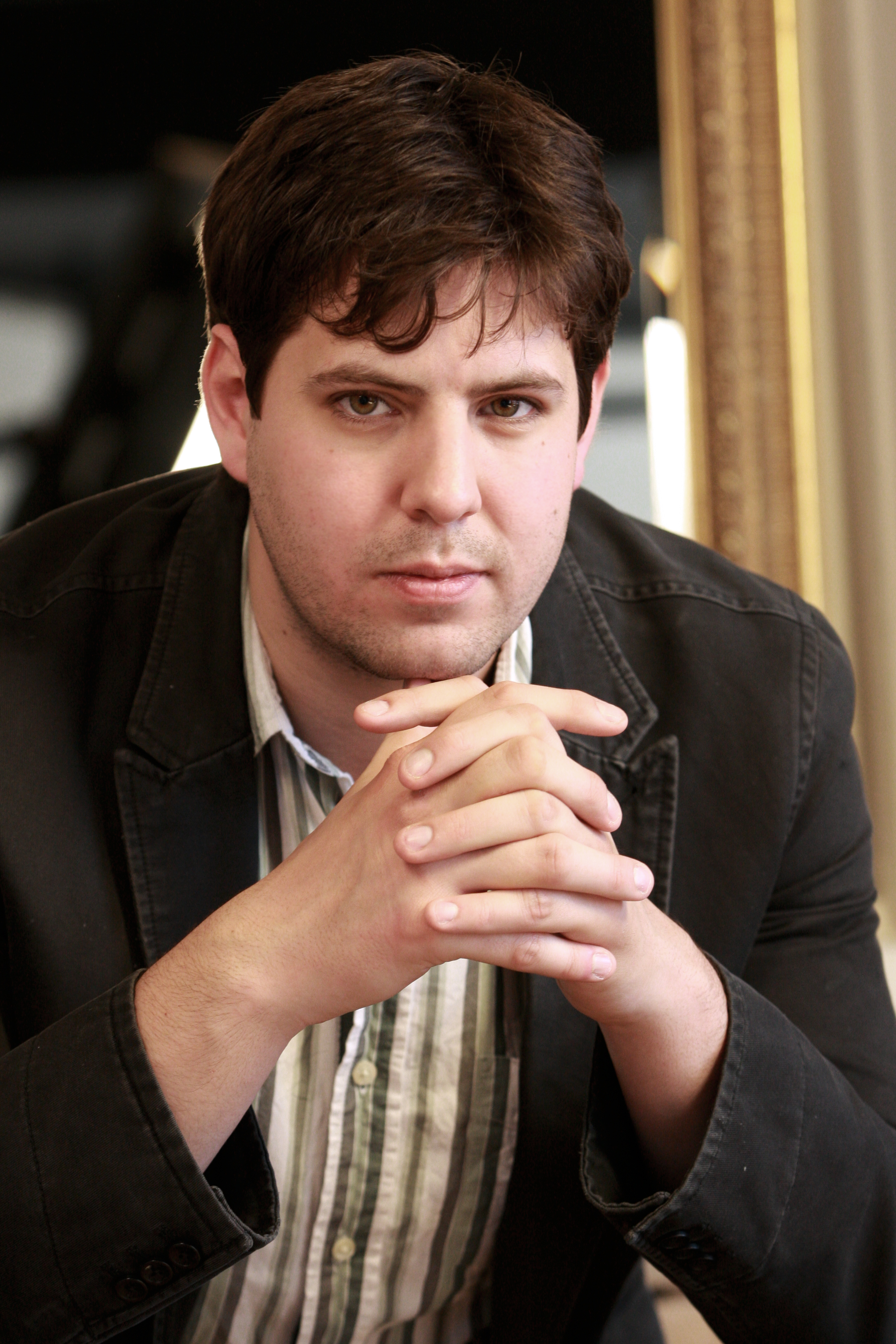
Canadian photojournalist Jay Bahadur

- M.J. Alexander (born 1961)
- Jay Bahadur (born 1984)
- Doug Ball (born 1953)
- Ken Bell (1914–2000)
- Amber Bracken (born 1984)
- Duncan Cameron (1928–1985)
- Jock Carroll (1919–1995)
- Ora Cogan
- William DeKay
- Robert Del Tredici (born 1938)
- Lawrence Earl (1915–2005)
- Kevin Frayer (born 1973)
- Dina Goldstein (born 1969)
- Lyn Hancock (born 1938)
- Tom Hanson (1967–2009)
- Kiana Hayeri (born 1988)
- Dan Hudson (born 1959)
- Zahra Kazemi (1948–2003)
- Frank Lennon (1927–2006)
- Rod MacIvor (born 1946)
- Peter Martin
- Peter H. Martyn (born 1948)
- Jo-Anne McArthur (born 1976)
- Sheila McKinnon

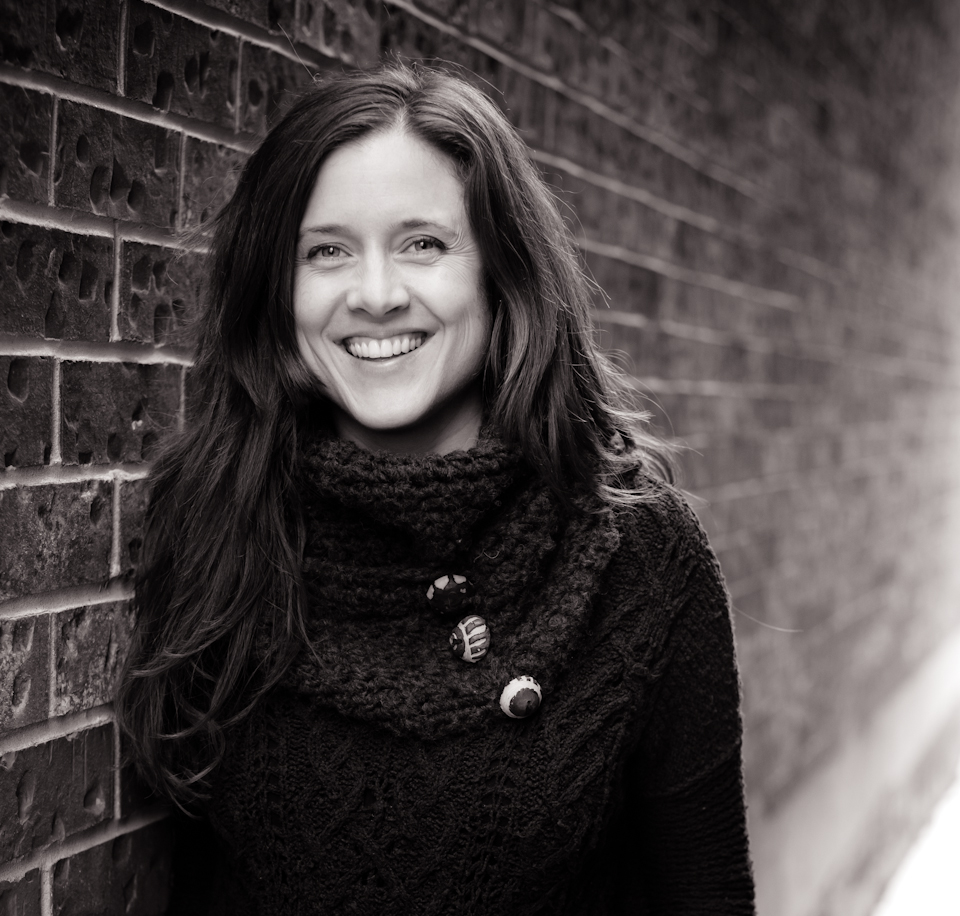
Canadian photojournalist, humane educator, animal rights activist and author Sheila McKinnon

- Dilip Mehta (born 1952)
- Charles Montgomery (born 1968)
- Finbarr O'Reilly (born 1971)
- Ed Ou (born 1986)
- Lyle Owerko
- Louie Palu (born 1968)
- Bob Peterson (born 1944)
- Conrad Poirier (1912–1968)
- Jonathan Savoie (born 1973)
- Lana Šlezić (born 1973)
- Boris Spremo (1935–2017)
- Jack Turner (1889–1989)
- Tamio Wakayama (1941–2018)
- Paul Watson (born 1959)
- Antoine Desilets (1927-2019)
- Armour Landry (1905-1994)
