= Dekay =

Dekay, DeKay, or De Kay may refer to:

== People ==
- James Ellsworth De Kay (1792–1851), American zoologist
- Tim DeKay (born 1963), American actor
- William DeKay, Canadian photojournalist
- Daniel Dekay, guitarist for the band Exciter

== Other ==
- "Dekay", a song by Ho99o9 from the album United States of Horror
