= Jonathan Savoie =

Canadian photographer based in Tokyo

- Born: Halifax, Nova Scotia
- Education: Self-taught
- Known for: Photographer
- Website: jonathansavoie.com

Jonathan Savoie is a Tokyo-based commercial and editorial photographer who specializes in travel photography, minimalist architecture, and urban landscapes. He is known for his use of vibrant colors combined with detailed and often complex subject matter. His work has appeared in Condé Nast Traveler, Frame, Interior Design, Casa Brutus, GQ Italy, and Casa Vogue.

== Life and work ==
Raised in Canada, Savoie moved to Europe to study art and design before relocating permanently to Tokyo in 2003 to pursue a photography career. Soon after moving to Tokyo Savoie immersed himself in the city's skateboarding scene and befriended the Editor-in-Chief of Transworld Skateboarding Japan, who invited him to shoot a feature for the magazine. For the next few years Savoie became a contributor to Transworld Skateboarding, Warp, Surfing Life, and the arts and culture magazine Tokion.

Savoie signed with AVGVST, a Tokyo creative management agency, in 2004 and started to focus on fashion and commercial photography. The same year, Sony and Konami hired Savoie to photograph the key artwork for the worldwide release of their video game Metal Gear Solid 3.

In 2005, Savoie began working on a project titled "Tokyo Privé" which was later published as a book in 2007. It is an album of snapshot photographs taken by Savoie with a point-and-shoot camera that are meant to "capture those odd moments of beauty that are always around us but usually fleeting." "Tokyo Privé" acts as Savoie's visual diary of Tokyo, and he states that it is "not a true reflection of how the city really is but simply as I remember it."

In 2006, Savoie continued his commercial work receiving commissions from MUFG Bank, Japan Airlines, Universal Records, and Uslu Airlines. The same year he left AVGVST and signed with the international agency GA, focusing on modern architecture and urban landscapes.

== Personal life ==
Savoie resides with his two children in Tokyo, Japan.

== Exhibitions ==
- 2003: Blister in the Sun, Gallery NeuBacher, Toronto
- 2004: Absence of Luxury, SPIN Gallery, Toronto
- 2006: Conception, Suite 16 Gallery, Tokyo
- 2013: Paysages affectifs, Galerie Youn, Montreal

== Publications ==
- Tokyo Privé. 2007. ISBN 978-0-9833901-0-7.
