= David Webster (architect) =

Scottish-Canadian architect

- Born: 1885; Glasgow, Scotland
- Died: 1 January 1952 (aged 66–67); Saskatoon
- Occupation: Architect
- Awards: Fellow of the Royal Architectural Institute of Canada
- Practice: Solo practitioner, also Webster and Noel; Webster and Gilbert
- Buildings: Noted for numerous schools in Saskatoon, Saskatchewan

David Webster (1885–1952) was a Scottish-Canadian architect best known for his designs of elementary schools in Saskatoon, Saskatchewan, Canada. His school designs were often in a Collegiate Gothic style emphasizing a central tower, locally referred to as a "castle style". Along with other local architects of his era, such as Walter LaChance and Storey and Van Egmond, Webster prospered during the province’s 1912 economic boom which sparked a frenzy of new construction.

== Biography ==
Webster was born in Glasgow, Scotland in 1885. However, one reputable source gives 1886 as the year of birth. He articled with the Glasgow firm of Jarvis and McAlpin, and moved to Winnipeg in 1902. During his six years in Winnipeg, he had four different employers: G.W. Murray, J. McDiarmid and Co., the Winnipeg office of Sprote, Rolph and Chrysler, and lastly, Herbert B. Rugh.

Webster moved to Saskatoon in 1908, forming the short-lived partnership of Webster and Noel (Joseph H. Noel). The two partners separated in 1909.

Webster played a key role in founding the Saskatchewan Association of Architects in 1911, and held membership card #1. He served six terms as president of the association. When World War I began, Webster served in a Canadian unit from 1915 to 1919. He was wounded in June 1918 in the Battle of Messines.

A second partnership was created in 1930 with E.J. Gilbert (Webster and Gilbert). In 1939, Webster moved to Regina to accept the position of Deputy Minister of Public Works in the provincial government, working under both Liberal and New Democratic Party administrations. His son, John Webster, became a partner in the firm of Webster and Gilbert at this point. The firm would go on to design such buildings as Royal University Hospital, the 1956 wing of Saskatoon's city hall, the Livestock Pavilion and Jubilee Buildings at the Saskatoon Exhibition Grounds, and elementary schools such as Churchill, Holliston, and the original Brunskill School.

From 1948 to 1950, David Webster was employed by the Saskatchewan Department of Public Works to supervise construction of certain buildings on the University of Saskatchewan campus in Saskatoon. He died at age 67 on 1 January 1952.

David Webster had been married twice. His first wife was Ada Webster of Liverpool, England, who died in 1928 at the age of 45. They had three sons and one daughter. Little is known about David Webster's second wife, except that she outlived him and they had a son together.

== Notable commissions ==
This list includes works attributed to Webster as a solo practitioner, and those attributed to the partnership of Webster and Noel, as well as the partnership of Webster and Gilbert.

All are extant unless otherwise specified. In chronological order:

=== Pre World War I ===
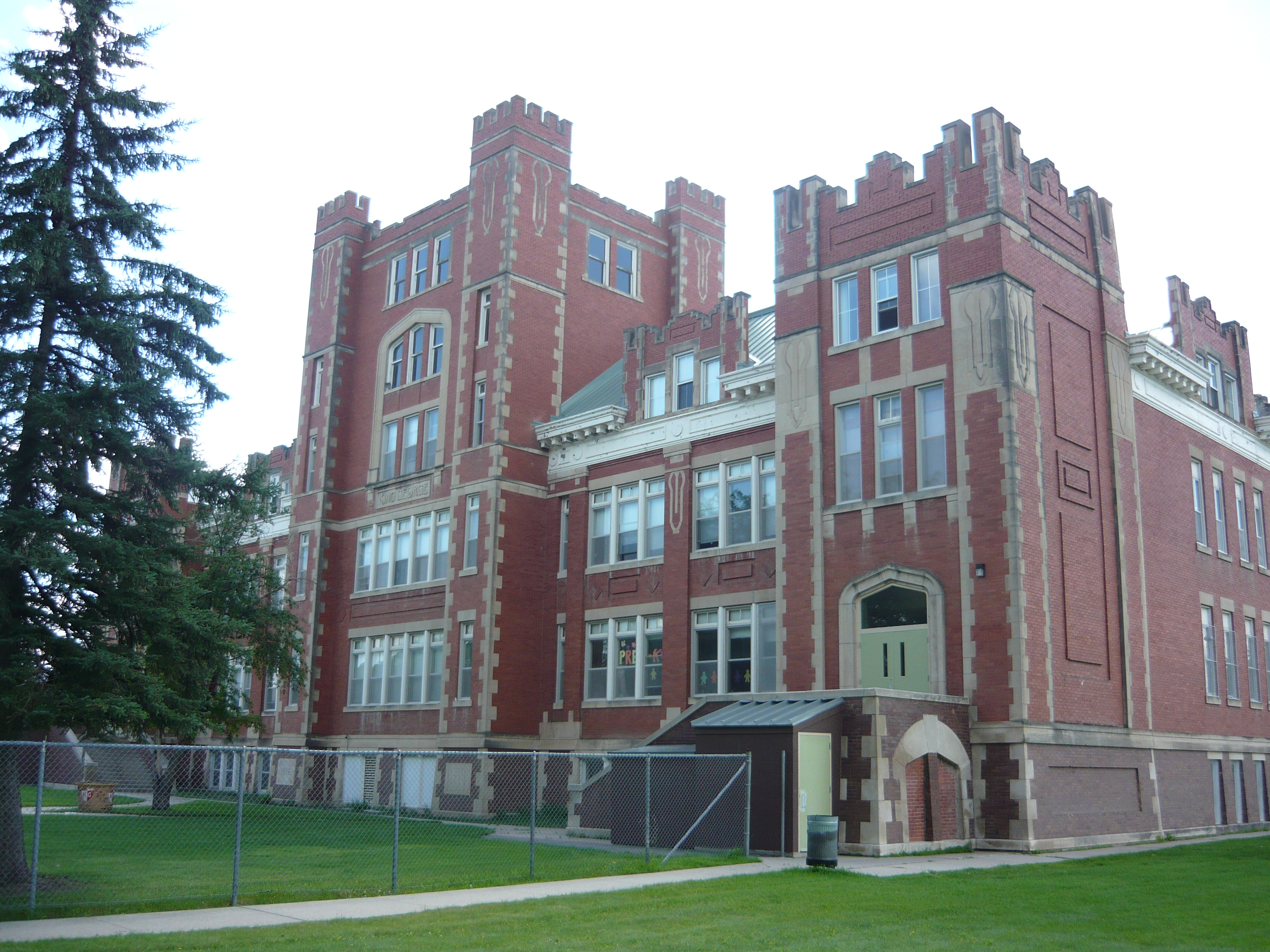
King George School (1912)

- First Baptist Church (1908, demolished), Third Avenue North at 21st Street, Saskatoon. Not to be confused with the church of the same name on Fourth Avenue North.
- Webster Block (1908), 804 McPherson Avenue at 10th Street East, Saskatoon. Later known as Dunrobin Apartments, now McPherson Court. This mock-Tudor apartment building was initially owned and managed by the architect himself, David Webster, who lived nearby.
- Kempthorne Block (1909), 157 Second Avenue South, Saskatoon. This three-story structure was built by Samuel L. Kempthorne, owner of a hardware store that operated on the ground floor.
- Bottomley Block (1910), 155 Second Avenue South, Saskatoon. This three-story structure was named for real estate investor Richard Bottomley. Also known as the Calder Block. The architects were the firm of Webster and Noel.
- Hopkins House (1910), 307 Saskatchewan Crescent West, Saskatoon. It was built for then-mayor William Hopkins. From 1938 to 1959, it was an apartment building known as Evergreen Lodge. From 1960 to 1980, it had been known as De Mazenod Hall, owned by the Oblates of Mary Immaculate, a Catholic religious order. It has been a private residence from 1980 onward.
- Caswell School (1911), 204 30th Street West at Avenue B North, Saskatoon. Named for Robert W. Caswell, who had a farm at this location. Webster also designed the 1930 addition.
- Princess Alexandra Public School (1911–1912, demolished 1961), 20th Street at Avenue H South, Saskatoon.
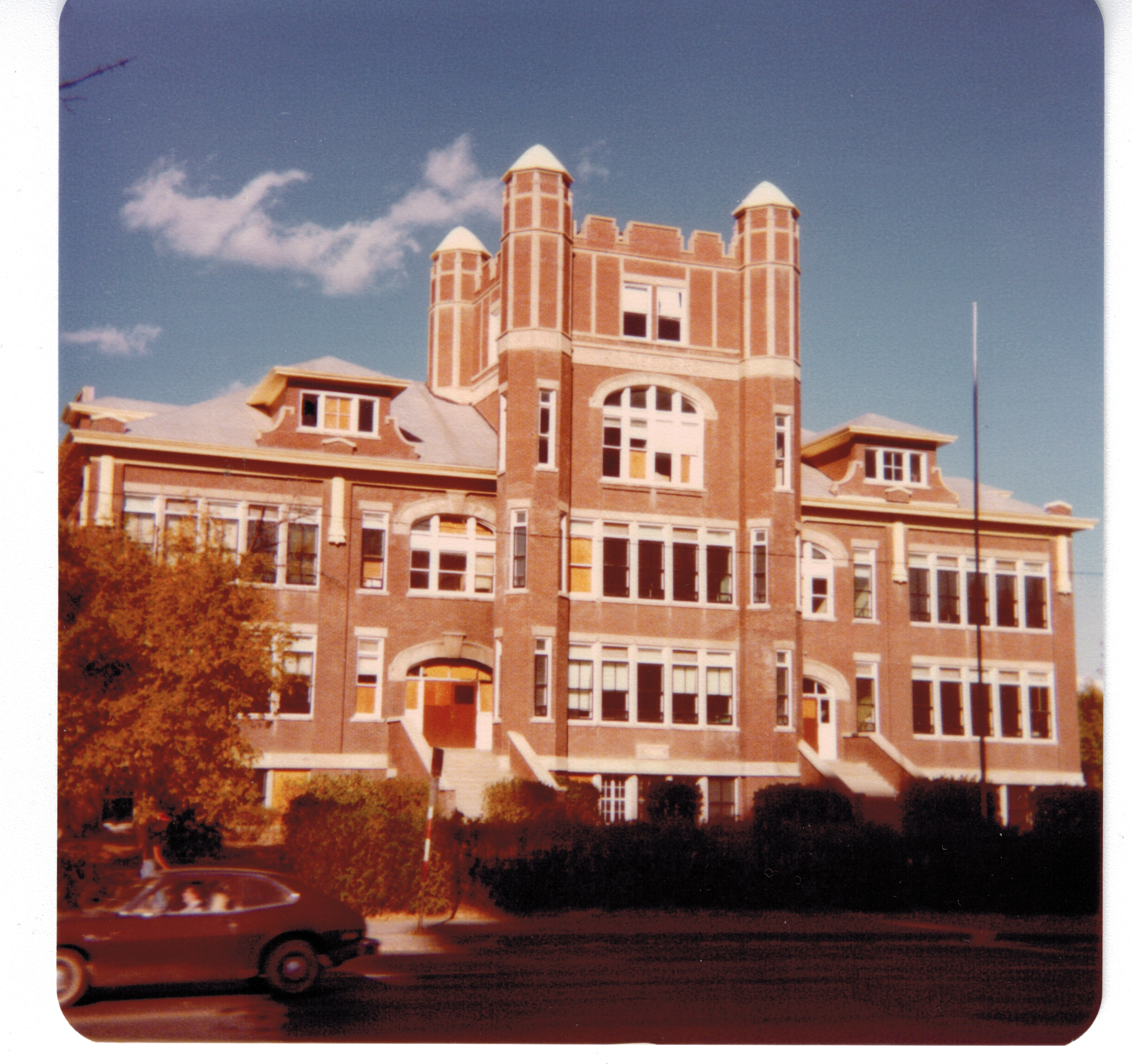
- King Edward Public School
  King Edward Public School (1911–1912, destroyed by fire 1960), 25th Street East at Sixth Avenue North. Saskatoon. On the site, a rectangular carved stone element from the school remains as a monument, bearing the name "King Edward School".
- Sutherland Public School (1911–1913, demolished 1959), Egbert Avenue at 110th Street, Saskatoon.
- Albert Public School (1912), 1001 11th Street East, Saskatoon. Municipal Heritage Property. Currently used as a community center.
- Adilman Building (1912, facade and other major renovations in 1949), 126 20th Street West at Avenue B, Saskatoon. This two-story building was originally a department store, also known at one time as the Saskatoon Trading Company Building. Its facade is a striking example of Streamline Moderne design.
- Grace Methodist Church (1912), 505 10th Street East at Eastlake Avenue, Saskatoon. Now Grace-Westminster United Church.
- King George Public School (1912), 721 Avenue K South at 16th Street West, Saskatoon.
- Westmount Public School (1912–1913), 411 Avenue J North at Rusholme Road, Saskatoon.
- St. Mary's School (1913), 337 Avenue O South at 19th Street West, Saskatoon. Demolished in 2012. It was the oldest Catholic school in the city.
- Connaught Block (1912-1913), 247 Third Avenue South, Saskatoon. This six-story residential building was also known as the Blain Block (after real estate investor and city councilor Frederick Blain), the McMillan-Blain Block, and the Herman Building. It was built alongside the neighboring Glengarry Block, and the two buildings share a common basement.
- Glengarry Block (1912-1913), 245 Third Avenue South, Saskatoon. This six-story office building was also known as the McMillan Block, and is adjacent to the Connaught Block, with which it shares a common basement.
- Buena Vista Public School (1914), 1306 Lorne Avenue at 6th Street East, Saskatoon.
- Addition to Saskatoon Collegiate Institute (1919), 411 11th Street East at Victoria Avenue, Saskatoon. Now known as Nutana Collegiate. The original 1910 building was designed by Storey and Van Egmond, but Webster was the architect of the 1919-1920 addition.

=== Interwar era ===
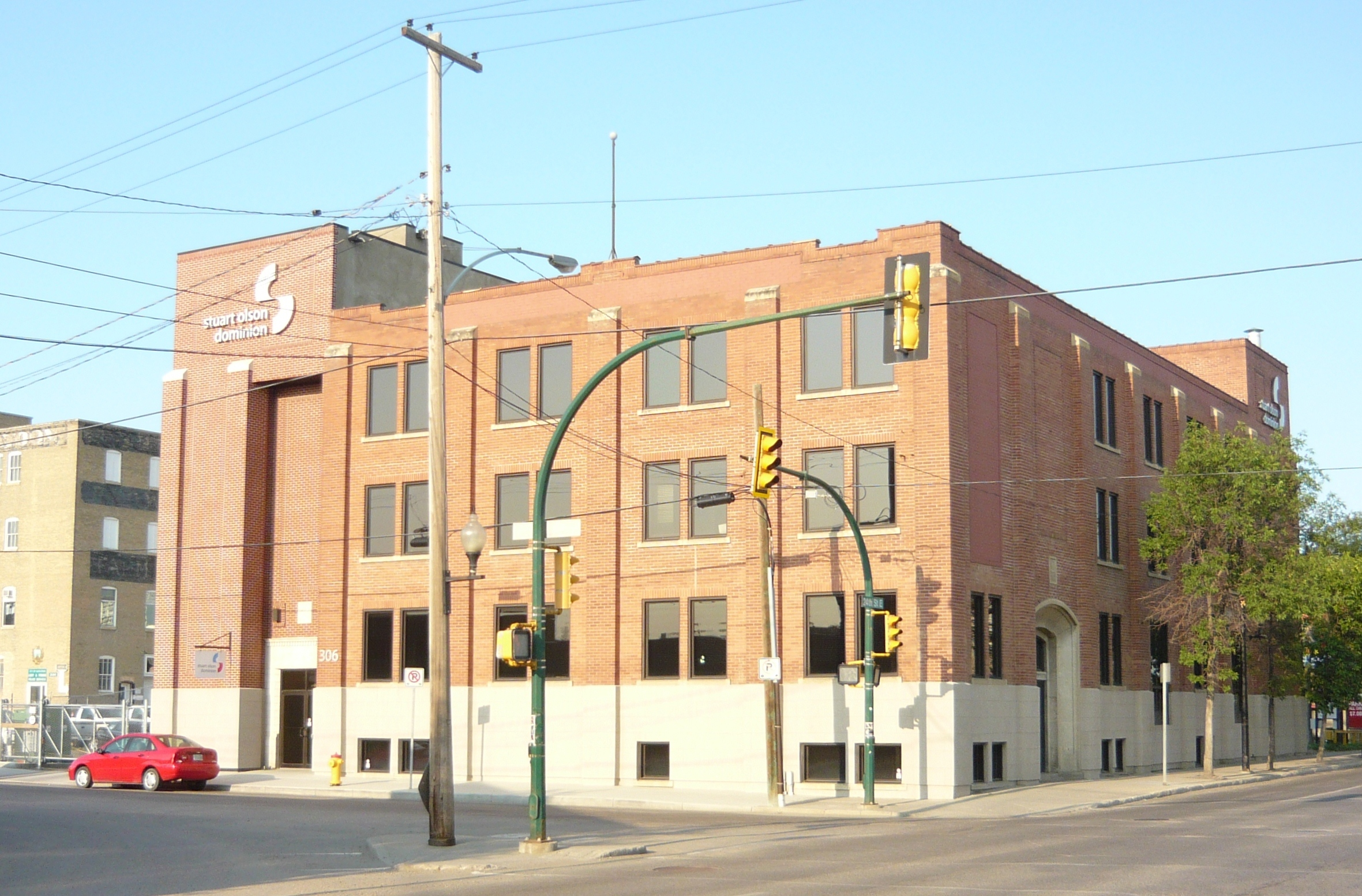
Saskatoon Cartage and Warehouse Company (1928)

- Hub City Brewing Company (1927), 519 Second Avenue North at Queen Street, Saskatoon. Also known as Pabst Brewing Company (according to a 1927 article in the Daily Commercial News, Toronto), Western Canada Brewing Company, Drewery's Limited, and O'Keefe Brewing. Now (since 1989) Great Western Brewing Company.
- Hoeschen House (1927), 309 Saskatchewan Crescent West, Saskatoon.
- St. Joseph’s Elementary Catholic School (1928), 919 Broadway at 9th Street, Saskatoon. Later Joe Duquette High School now Oskyak High School.
- Saskatoon Cartage and Warehouse Company (1928), 88 24th Street East at Ontario Avenue, Saskatoon. Designated as a Municipal Heritage Property. From 1945 to 1978, this three-story red brick warehouse was the MacCosham Building, named after the trucking firm. The City of Saskatoon acquired it in 1978 for its Central Purchasing Department, and it was later named the Arthur Cook Building, after a municipal purchasing official. In 2010, the city sold the building to North Ridge Development Corporation, who has renovated the structure as an office building.
- Saskatoon Police Station (1929, demolished), Fourth Avenue North at 23rd Street East, Saskatoon.
- Kewanee Apartments (1930), 502 Fifth Avenue North at 26th Street East, Saskatoon. The dual concrete arches over the entrance are an interesting feature.
- Cambridge Court Apartments (1930), 129 Fifth Avenue North at 23rd Street East, Saskatoon. Designated as a Municipal Heritage Property.
- Davis Dairy (1930), 731-733 Broadway, Saskatoon. The exterior and interior have been substantially renovated, leaving nothing of the original structure. Attributed to the firm of Webster and Gilbert. Now a retail complex known as The Dairy.
- Earls Restaurant (1930), formerly McGavin's Bakery, 610 Second Avenue North at Queen Street, Saskatoon.
- Foam Lake Post Office (1938), 333 Main Street, Foam Lake, Saskatchewan.
- Yorkton Armoury (1939), 56 First Avenue North, Yorkton, Saskatchewan.
- First Baptist Church (1943–1945), 401 Fourth Avenue North at 25th Street East, Saskatoon. Not to be confused with the 1908 church of the same name (since demolished) on Third Avenue North.

=== Post World War II ===
- Modern Press Building (1949), 446 Second Avenue North at 26th Street East, Saskatoon. Later Atomic Energy of Canada, now SaskTel. The exterior and interior have been substantially renovated, leaving nothing of the original structure.
- Broadway Theatre (1947), 715 Broadway Avenue, Saskatoon. Originally Odeon Theatre. A plaque on the building attributes its design to the firm of Webster and Gilbert. However, a Parks Canada website states that the architect was George Forrester.
- Sheptytsky Institute (1950), 1236 College Drive at Wiggins Avenue, Saskatoon. This was originally built to serve Ukrainian Catholic students at the University of Saskatchewan. Demolished in 2026.

== Gallery ==
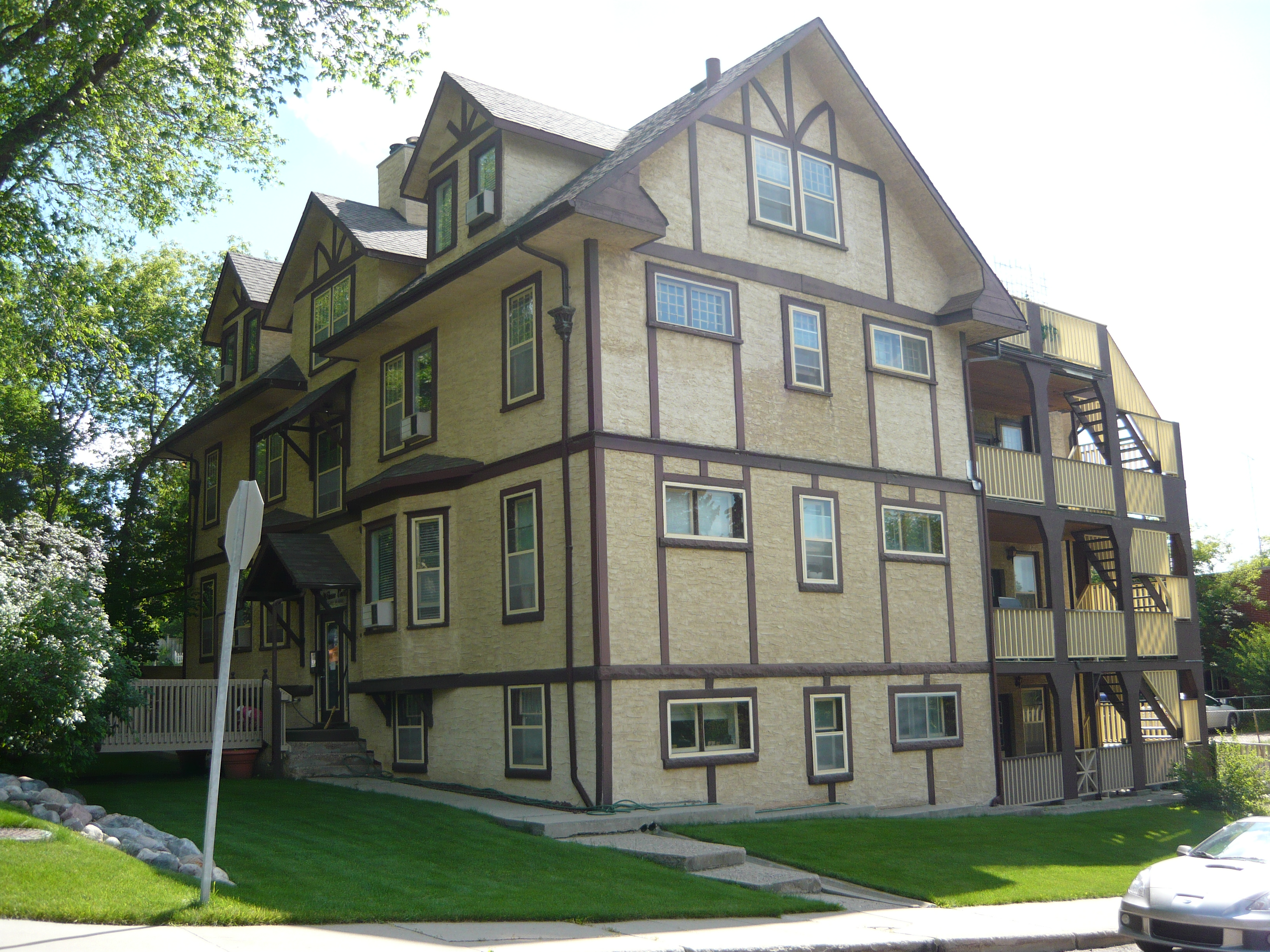
Webster Block (1908)

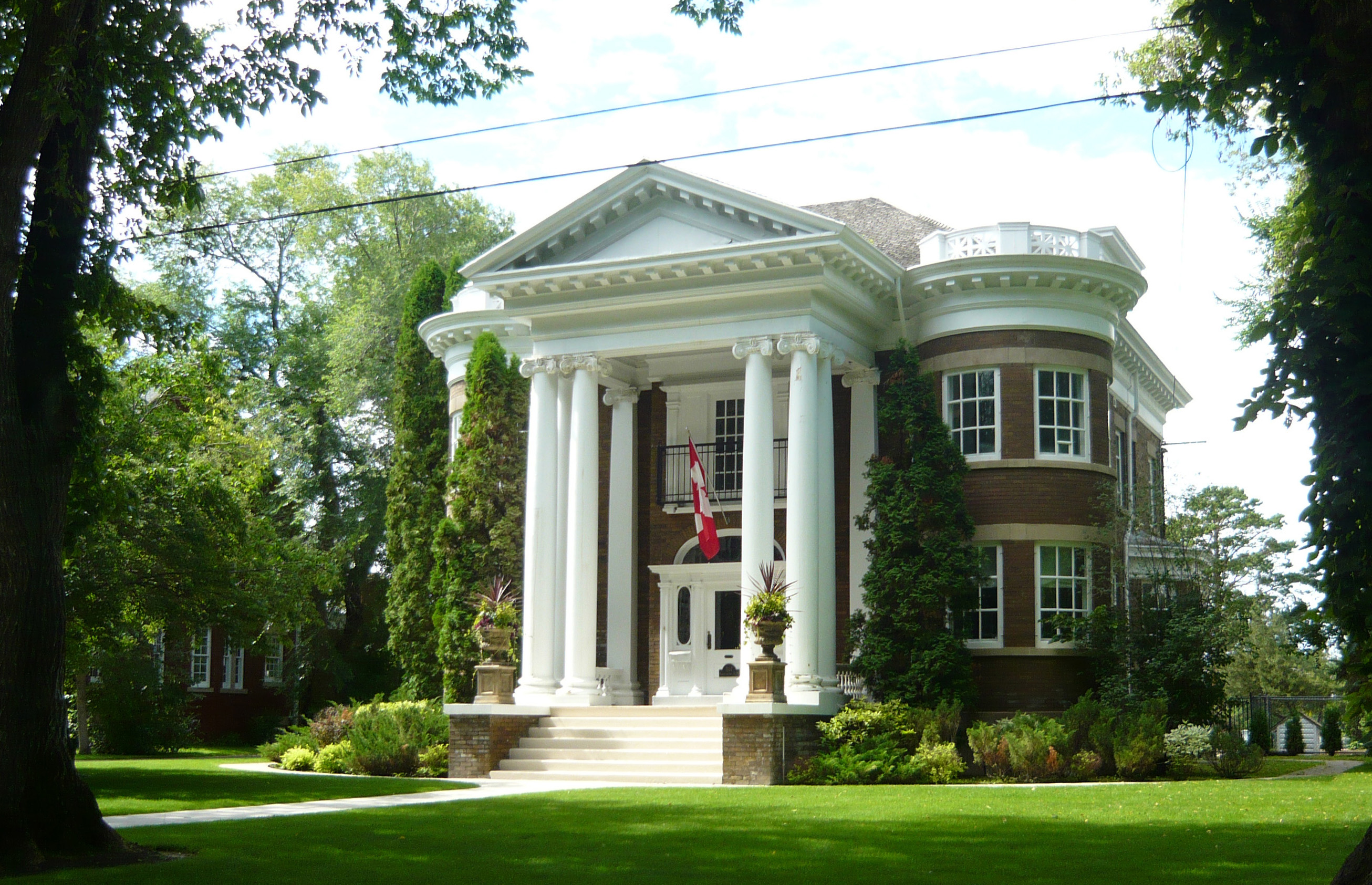
Hopkins House (1910)

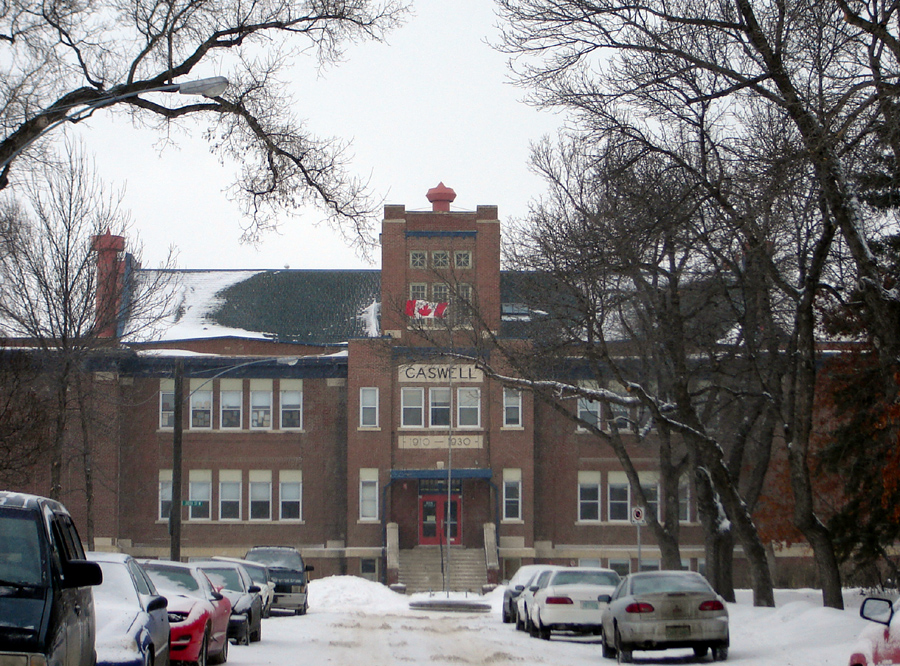
Caswell School (1911)

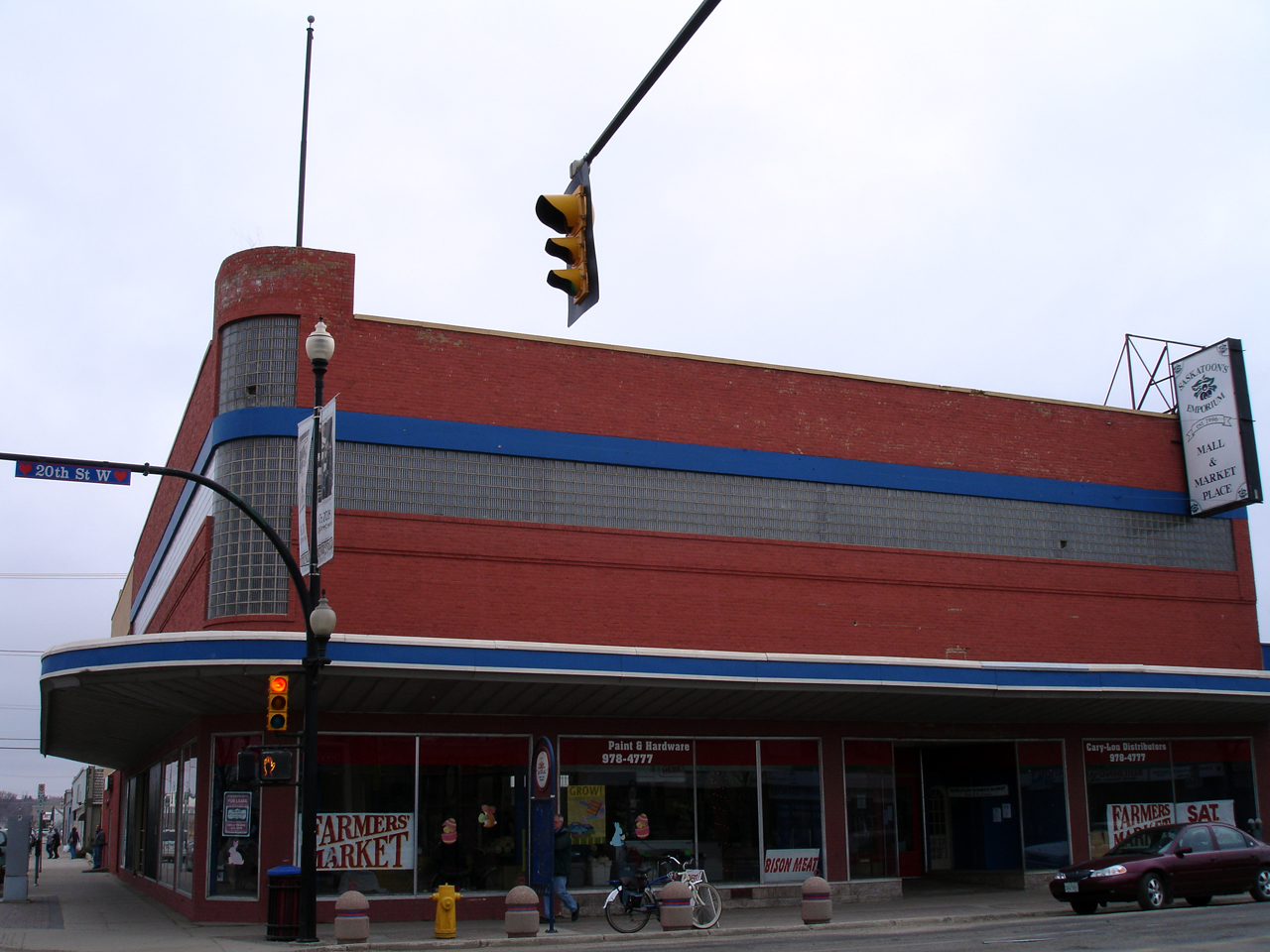
Adilman Building (1912, facade 1949)

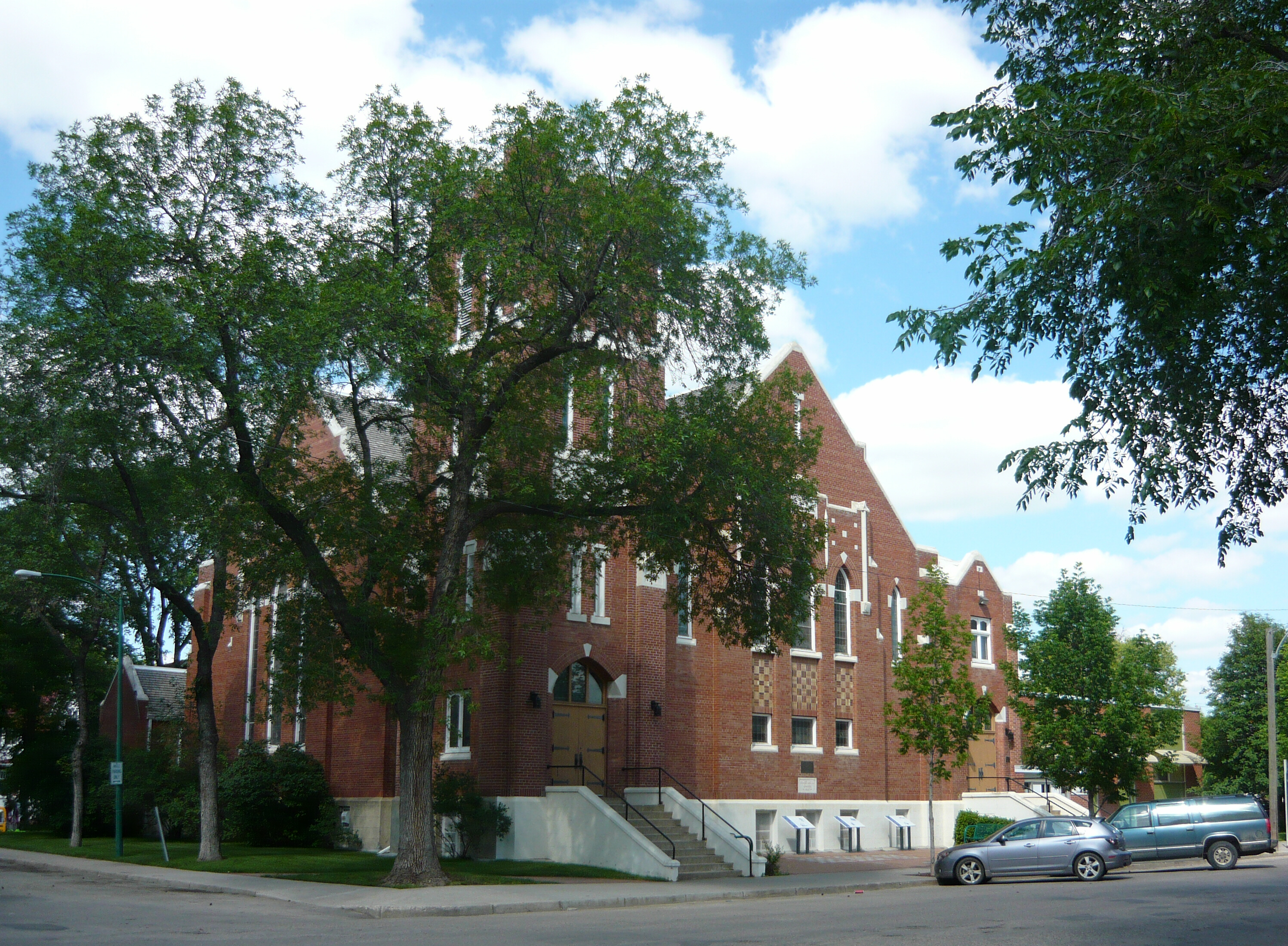
Grace Methodist Church (1912)

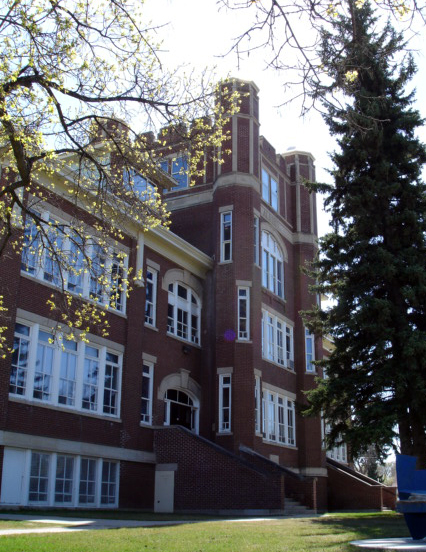
Albert School (1912)

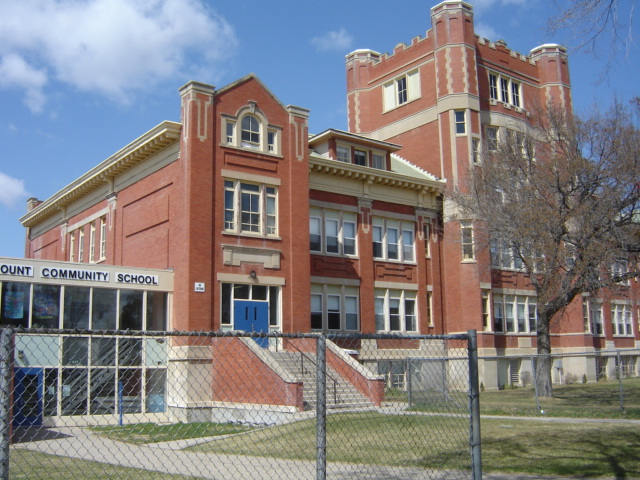
Westmount School (1912-1913)

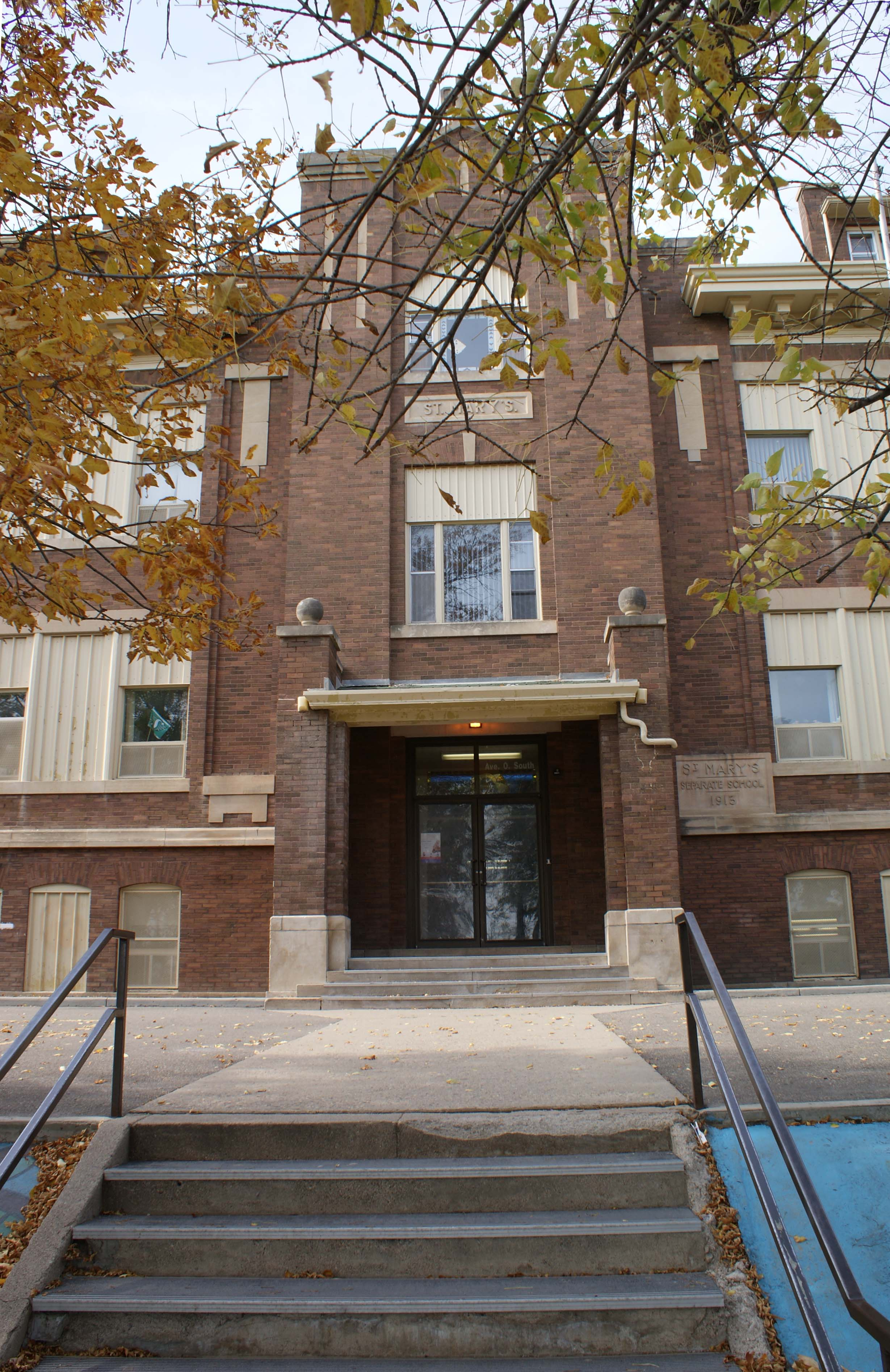
St. Mary's School (1913)

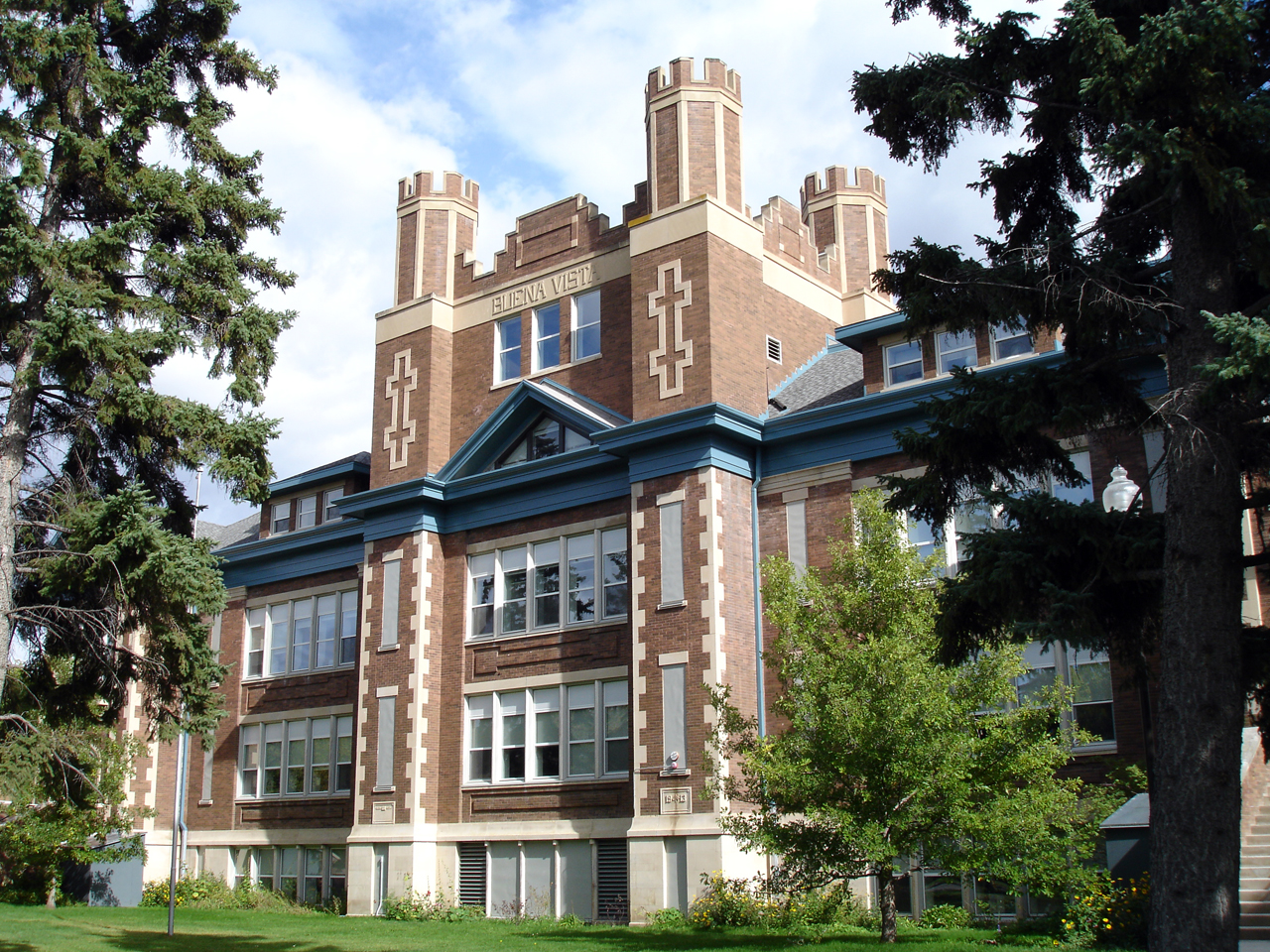
Buena Vista School (1914)

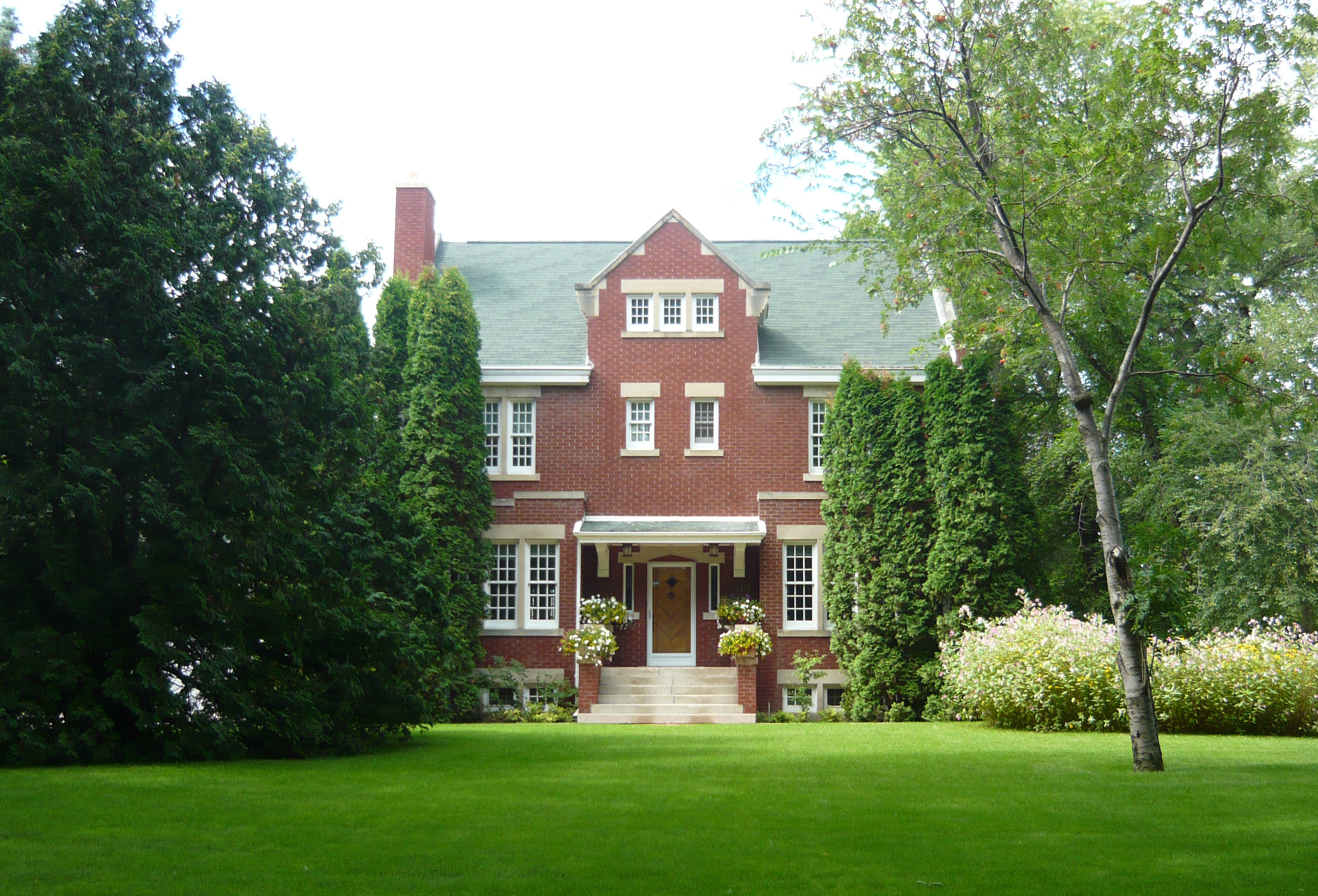
Hoeschen House (1927)

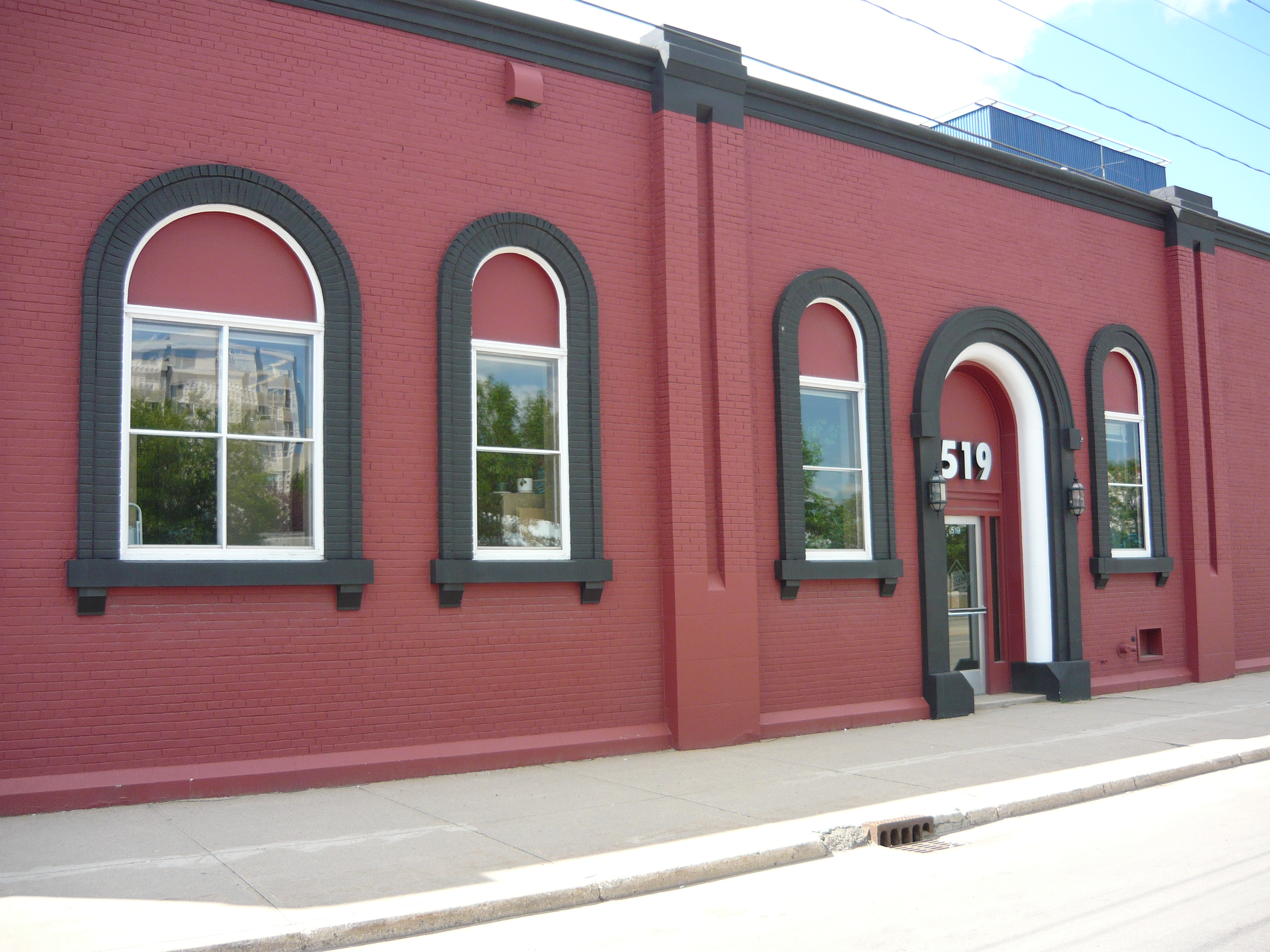
Hub City Brewing (1927)

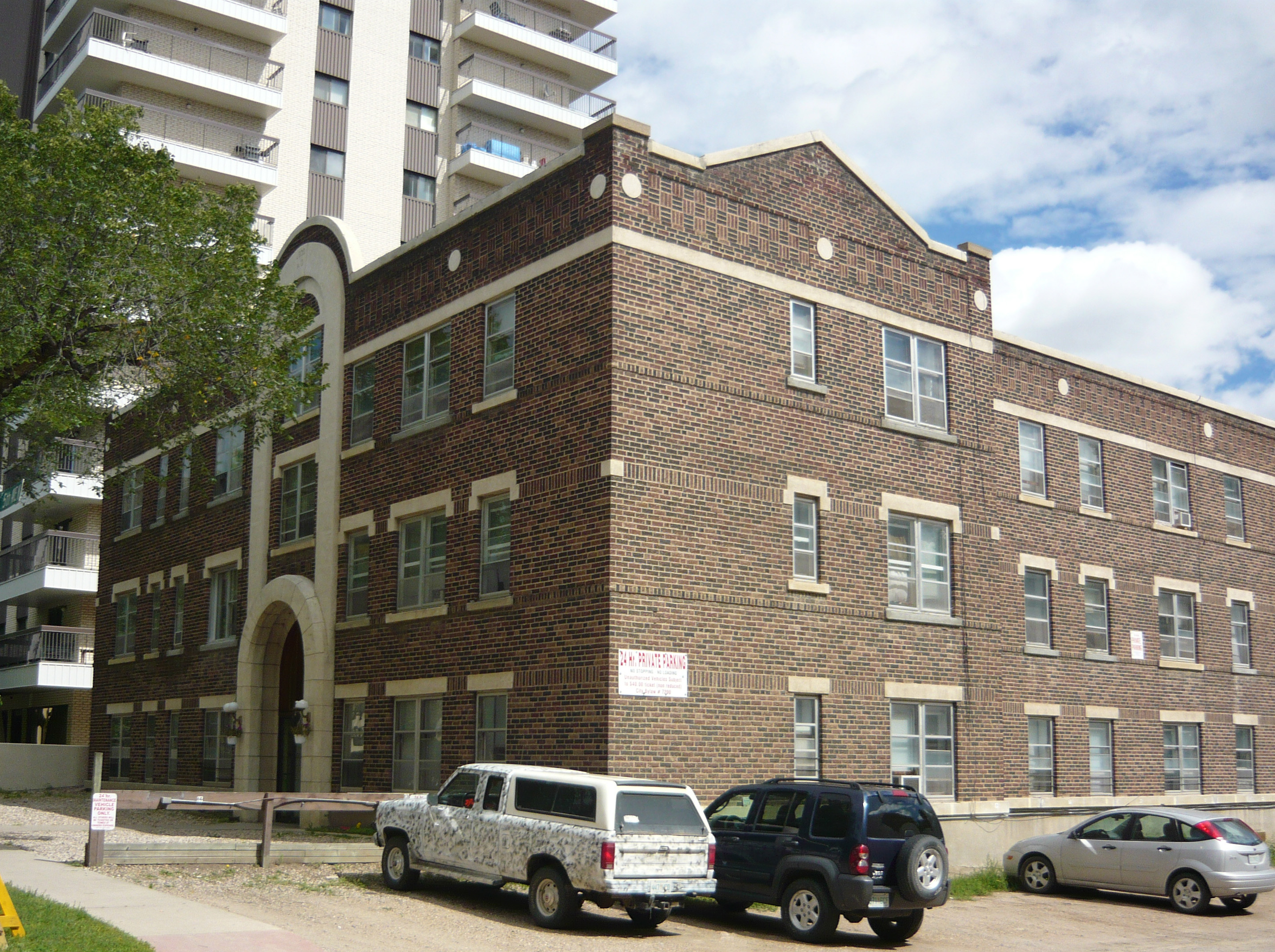
Kewanee Apartments (1930)

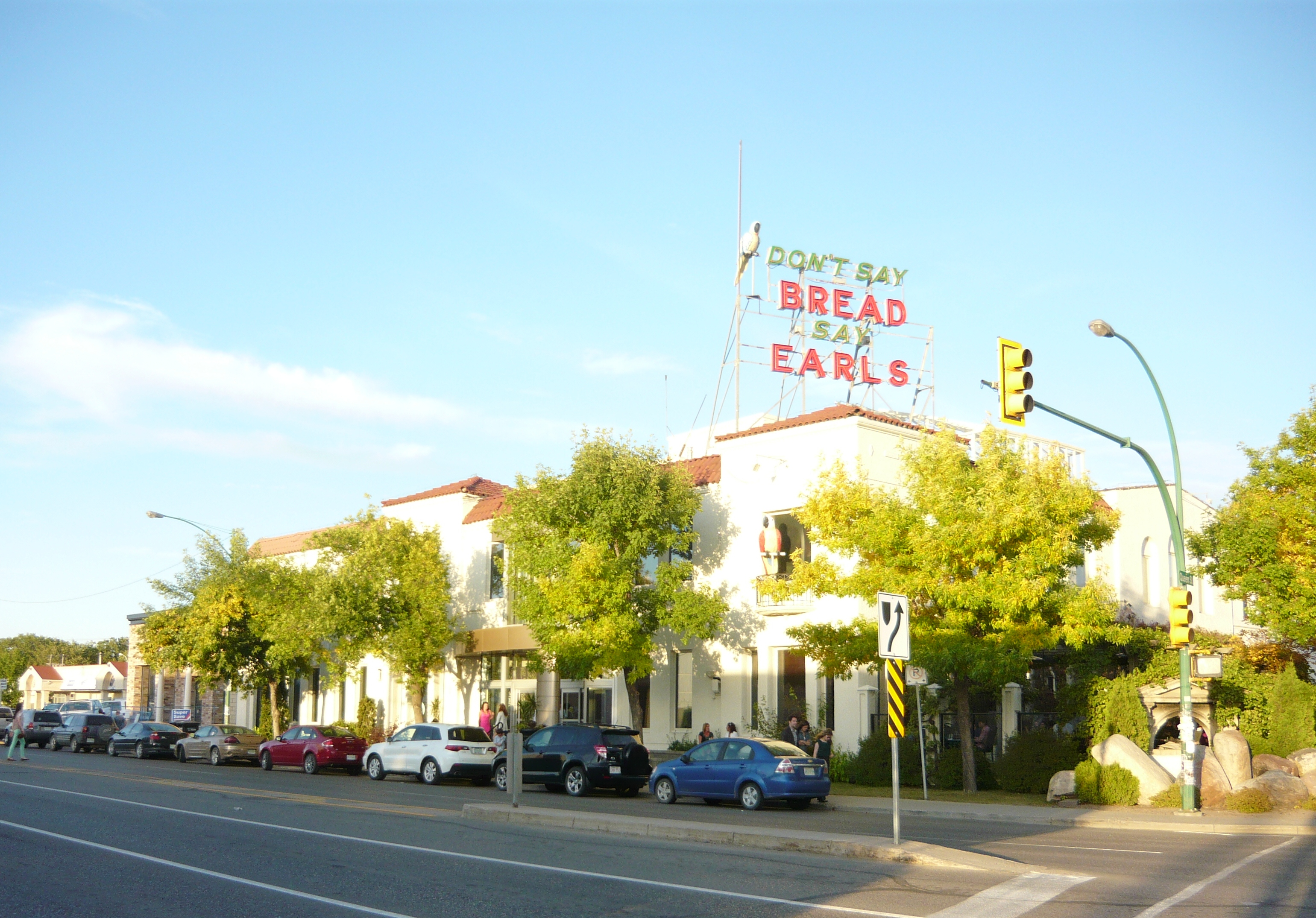
Earls Restaurant (1930)

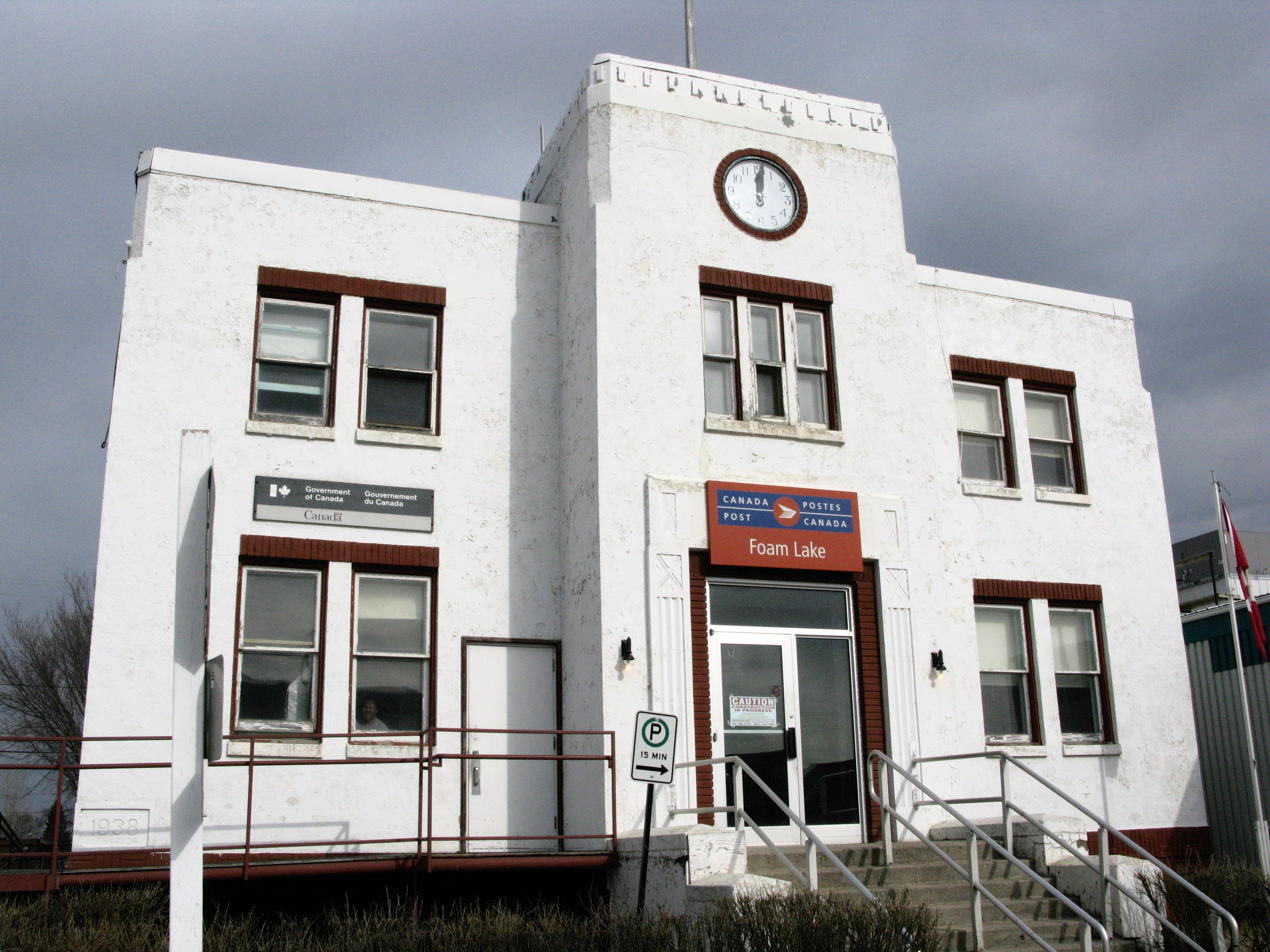
Foam Lake Post Office (1938)

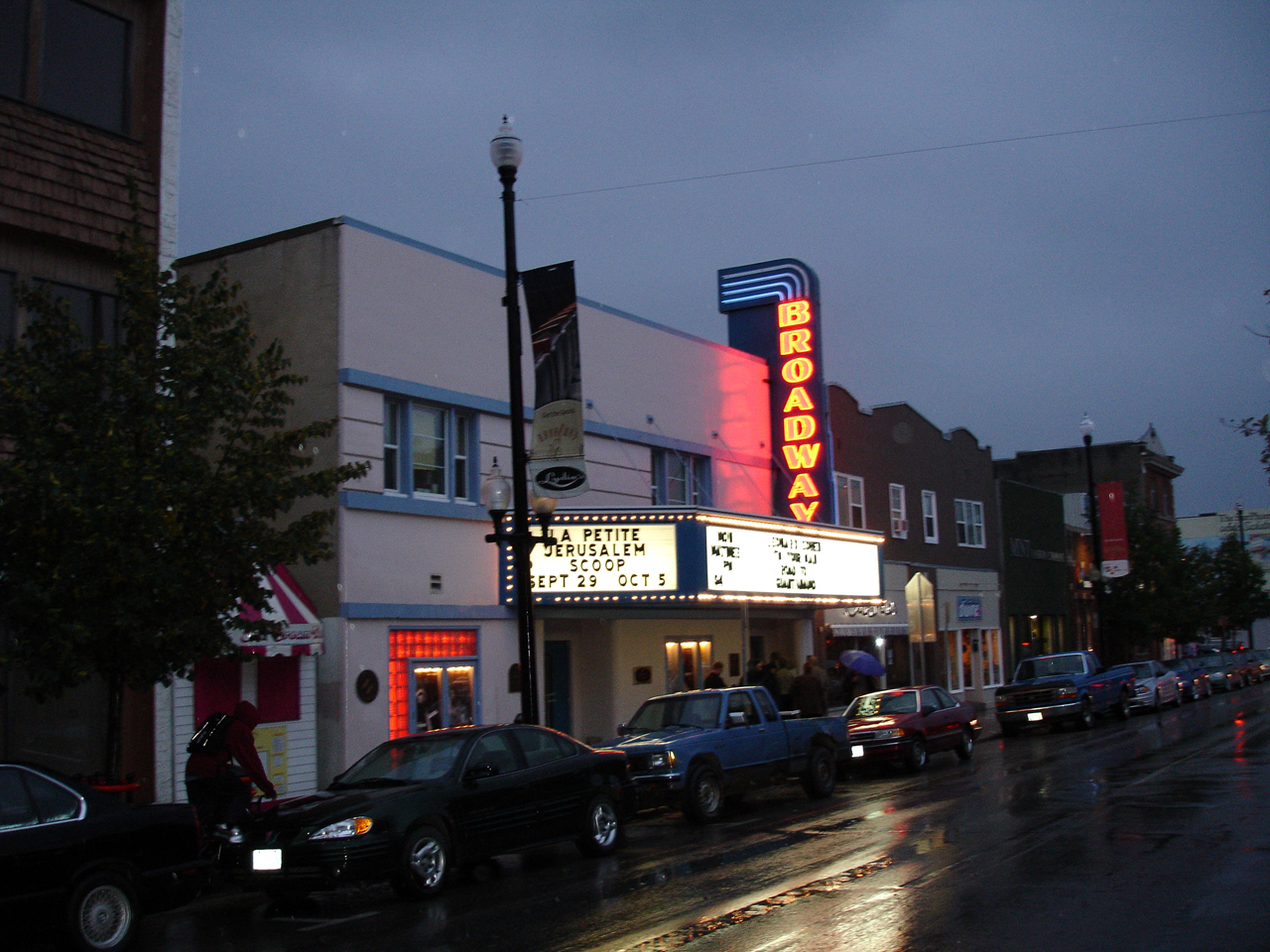
Broadway Theatre (1947)

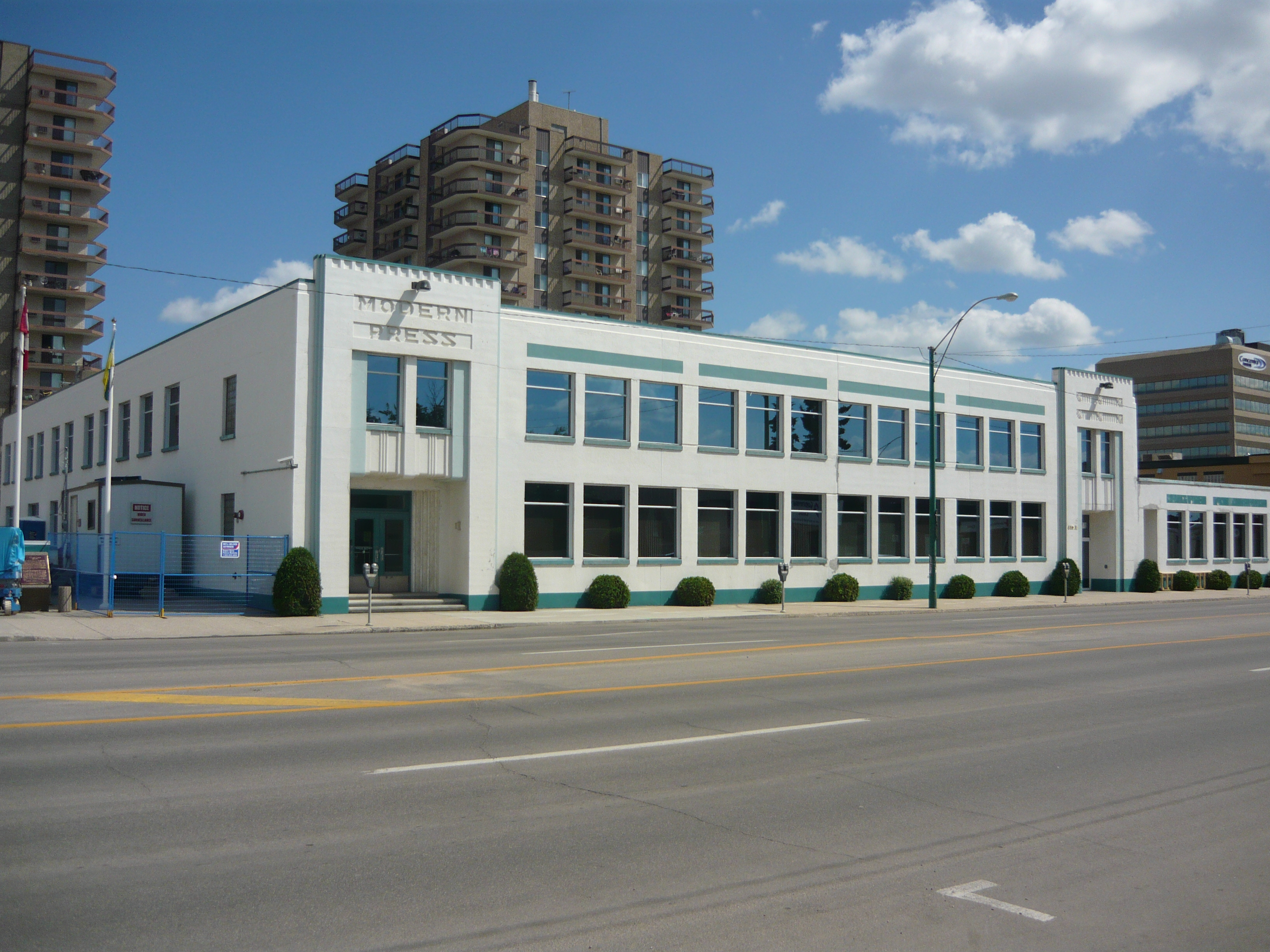
Modern Press Building (1949)

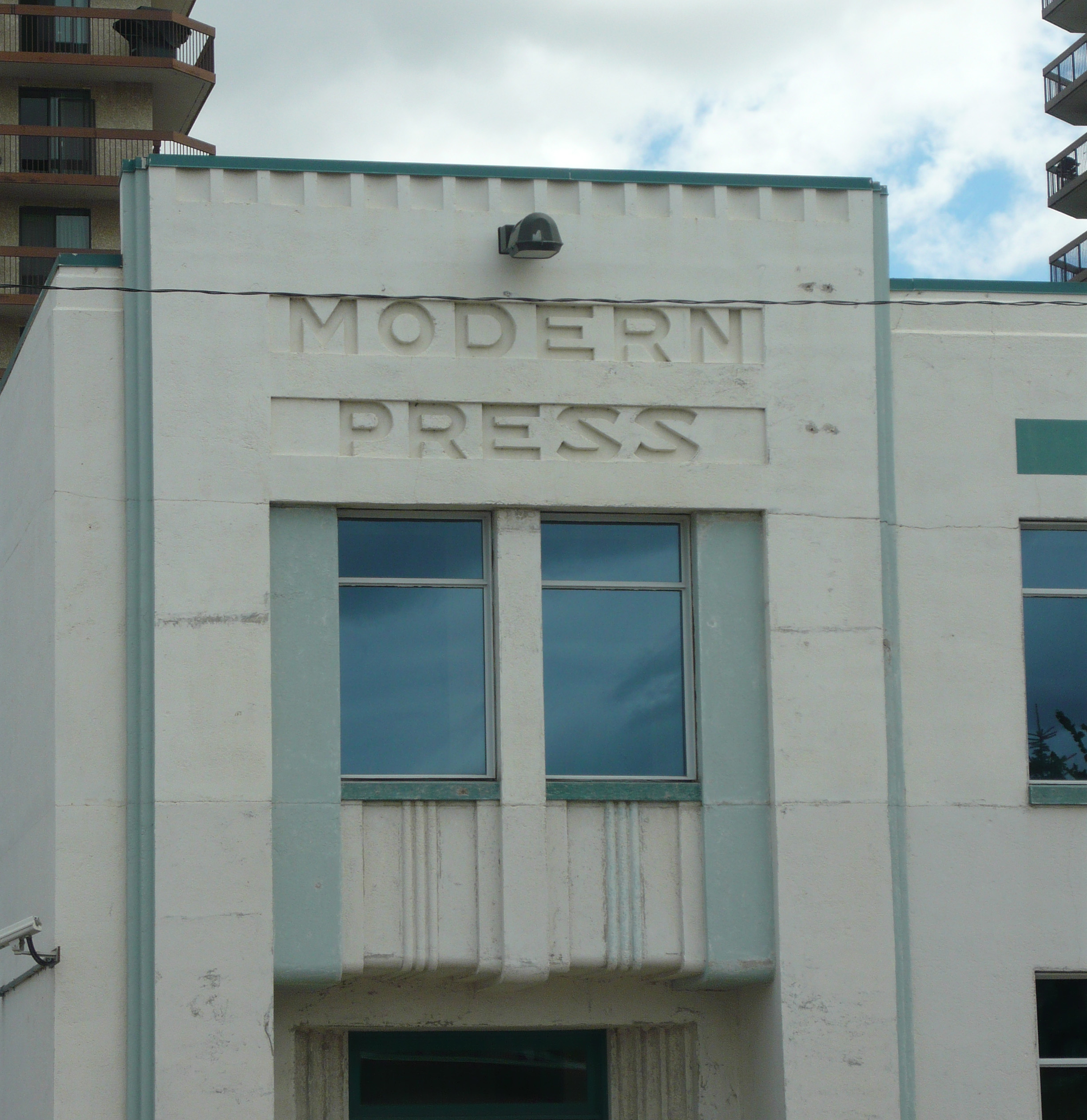
Modern Press Building façade detail

== External ==
Historic Places of Canada
