= Adilman Building =

Historic building in Saskatchewan, Canada

Coordinates: 52°07′35″N 106°40′17″W

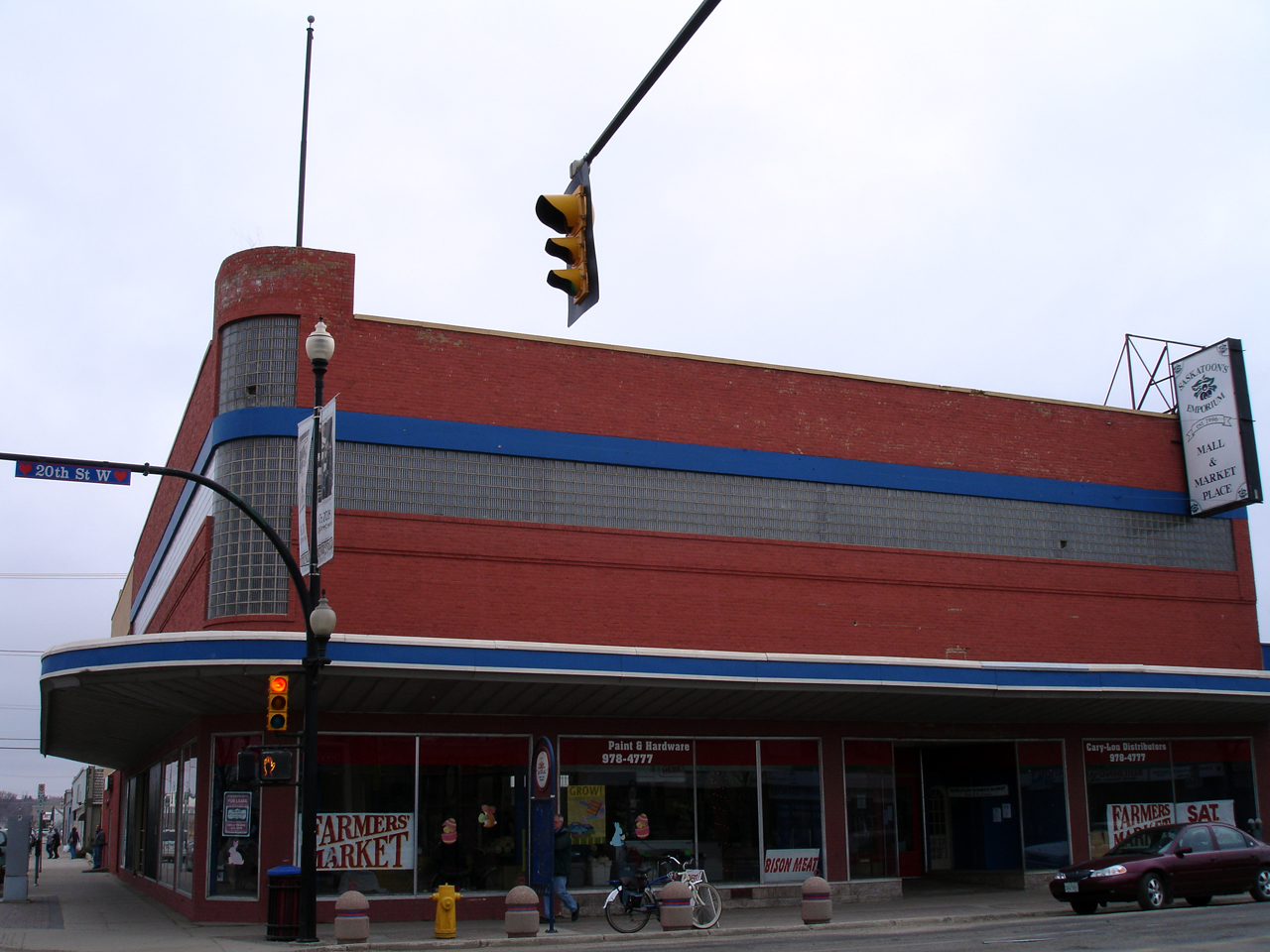
- Adilman Building in 2007

General information
- Architectural style: Streamline Moderne
- Location: Avenue B and 20th Street; 126-20th Street West, Saskatoon, Saskatchewan, Canada S7M 0W6
- Completed: 1912, 1921, 1949

Technical details
- Size: 9,825 square feet (912.8 m^{2}) per floor

Design and construction
- Architect: David Webster

The Adilman Building (built in 1912, expanded in 1921 and renovated in 1949) is a historic building in the Riversdale district of Saskatoon, Saskatchewan, Canada. It is one of Saskatoon's remaining examples of Streamline Moderne architecture.

Adilman's Department Store was a cornerstone of the 20th Street shopping district from its opening in 1921 until it closed in 1974. The Adilman family operated the department store from 1921 until Jack Adilman's retirement in 1974. One legacy of the department store was that the estate of Jack Adilman established a fund that each year supports amateur sports in Saskatoon.

Since the department store closed, it has housed an antique store, farmer's market, and bingo hall. The building was renovated in 2012–2013 and is currently occupied by an advertising agency and flower shop/home decor store.

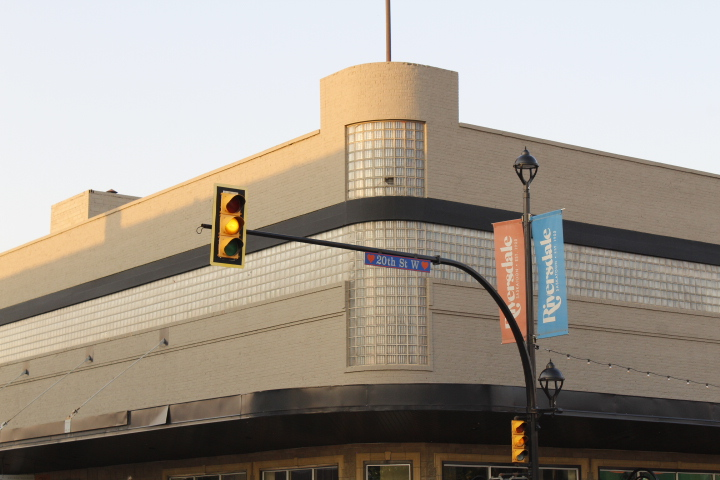
