= Arthur Cook Building =

Coordinates: 52°7′57″N 106°39′55″W

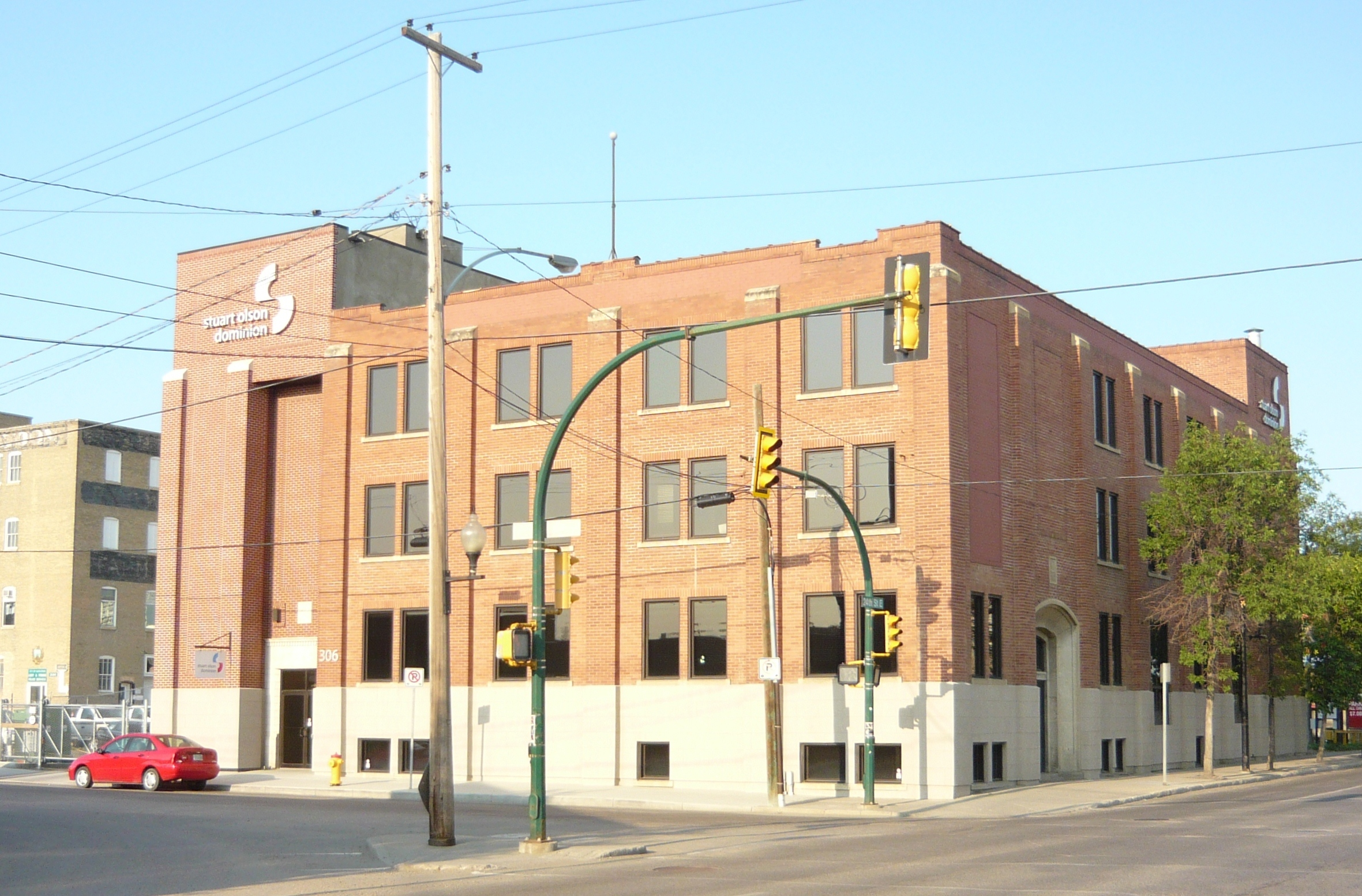
- Arthur Cook Building in 2012
- Interactive map of the Arthur Cook Building area

General information
- Location: 88 24th Street/306 Ontario Ave., Saskatoon, Saskatchewan, Canada
- Completed: 1928
- Renovated: 2010
- Client: Saskatoon Cartage and Warehouse Company

Technical details
- Size: 20,000 square feet
- Floor count: 3

Design and construction
- Architect: David Webster

Renovating team
- Renovating firm: North Ridge Developments

The Arthur Cook Building (built in 1928) is a designated historic building in the Central Business District, of Saskatoon, Saskatchewan, Canada. The three-storey brick and concrete warehouse was built in 1928 by the Saskatoon Cartage and Warehouse Company. It was designed by Saskatoon architect David Webster and built by the A.W. Cassidy Co. Ltd. It was sold to MacCosham Storage and Distribution in 1945 who used it until 1978. In 1978 the building was purchased by the City of Saskatoon and became the city's central stores, as well as housing the archives.

The building was designated as a historic building by the City in 2011 for the following reasons: (a) the building is an excellent example of the warehouse style in the 1920s; (b) the thick exterior walls, fire walls and interior vaults are of particular interest and demonstrate that the security of property was taken into account during construction. There have been relatively few alterations to the property since construction; (c) the building is sited on a corner giving it a prominent location in the warehouse district thus contributing highly to the character of the district; and (d) it was constructed for Saskatoon Cartage and Warehouse Company and offered fireproof storage for freight valuables. The Company's proprietor, James McCallum, was a leading citizen of Saskatoon. Arthur E. Cook was a long-time keeper of City Stores from 1921 to 1952

In 2009, a Request for Proposal was issued by the City for the redevelopment of the Arthur Cook Building (88 24th Street E). The winning bid was received from North Ridge Development Corporation. The city sold the building to North Ridge Developments in 2010. North Ridge then converted the building into commercial and office space as part of a $2.2 to 2.5 million renovation. The renovations added a new section on the northwest corner of the building to provide a new entrance with stairs and an elevator. This resulted in an address change (306 Ontario Ave.). A single tenant, Stuart Olson Dominion Construction, leased the entire building. The law firm Scott Phelps & Mason occupies the main floor of the building. The information technology firm BDM IT Solutions Inc. occupies the 3rd floor.
