= Modern Press Building =

Coordinates: 52°8′4″N 106°39′37″W

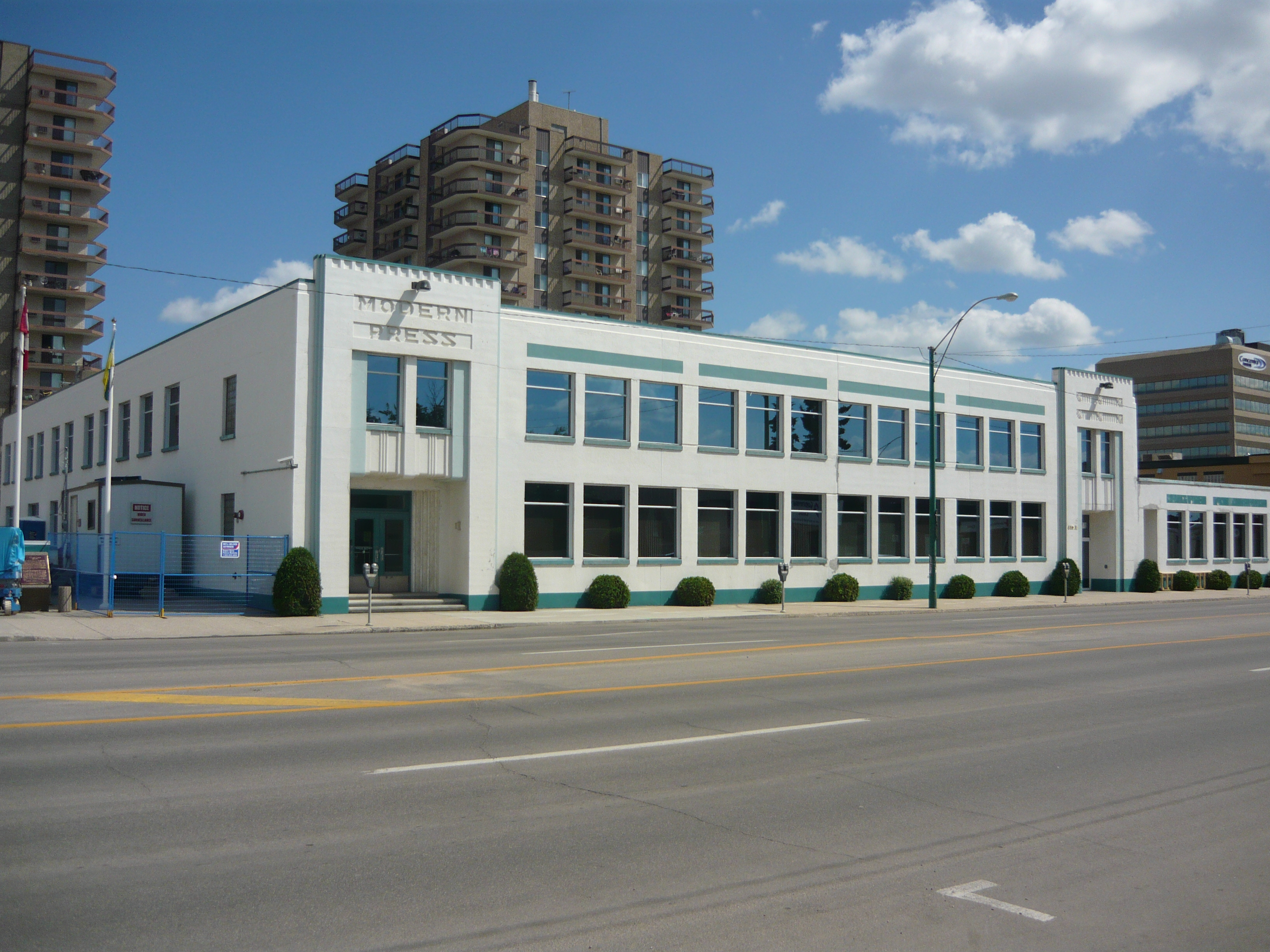
- Modern Press Building
- Interactive map of the Modern Press Building area

General information
- Architectural style: Streamline Moderne
- Location: 446 2nd Avenue North, Saskatoon, Saskatchewan, Canada
- Completed: 1927
- Renovated: 1947, 1993, 2011
- Client: Modern Press

Technical details
- Floor count: 2

Design and construction
- Architect: David Webster

The Modern Press Building (originally built in 1927 and thoroughly renovated in 1947, 1993, and 2012) is a historic building in the City Park District, of Saskatoon, Saskatchewan, Canada. The original building was designed by David Webster.

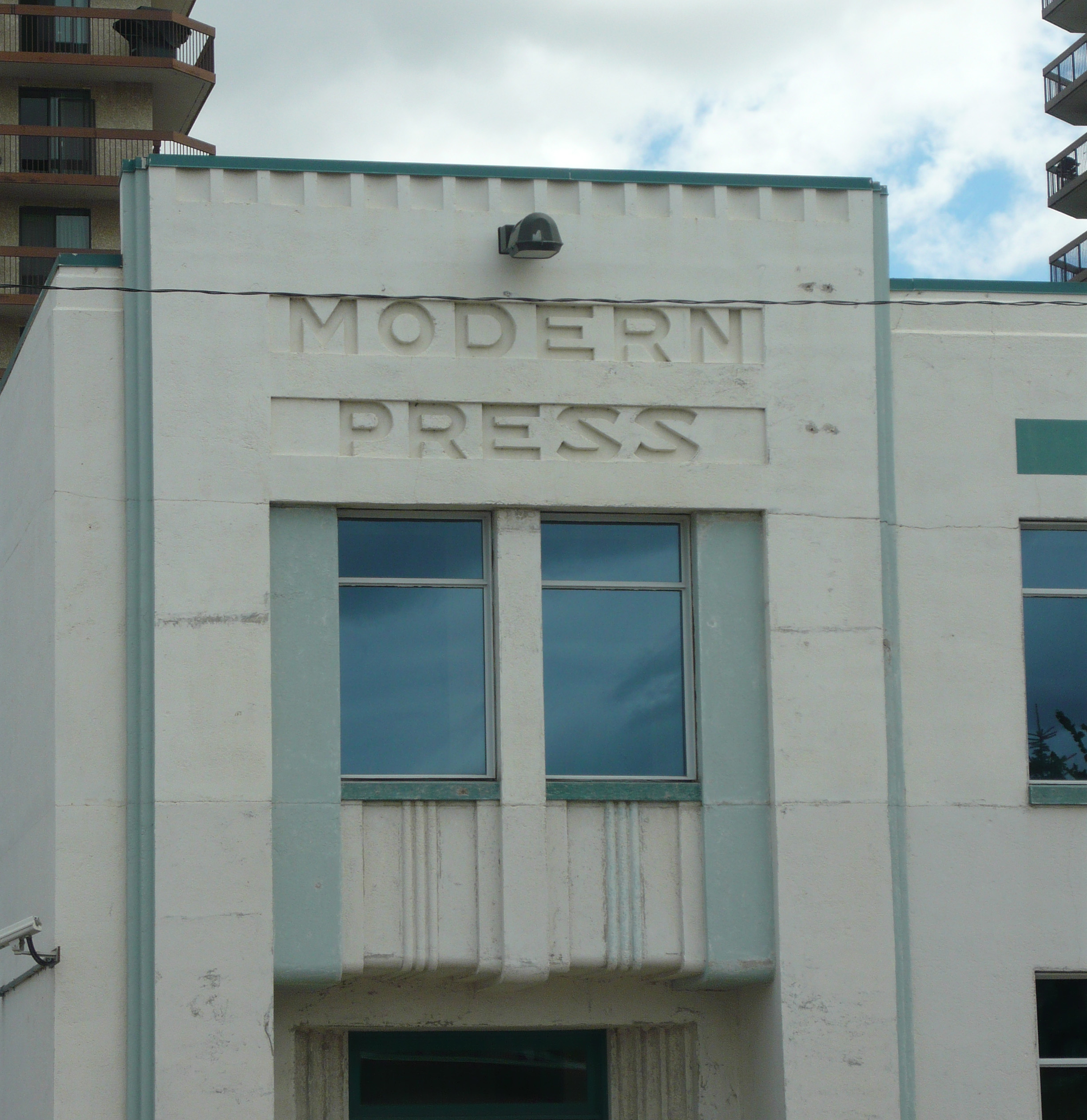
Façade detail

The building was originally built as a two-story art deco building to house the Modern Press printing-press equipment and offices. Modern Press was originally purchased by the Saskatchewan Wheat Pool, with its most notable publication being The Western Producer. The Western Producer continued to use the building until moving into new facilities in 1979.

In 1993 the building was renovated by Atomic Energy of Canada to house the offices for the CANDU 3 reactor design program; resulting in the architectural firm of Heney Klypak Architect Ltd. winning the 1994 Heritage Design Award. AECL closed down the CANDU 3 program in 1996, eventually resulting in SaskTel moving into the building.

In 2011, work started on the four story granite and high polish stainless steel, Nexus Building, a modern interpretation of art deco, beside the Modern Press Building, to house the offices of The Mid-West Group, owner of the Modern Press building since 1997. From 1998 and as of 2014, the Modern Press Building is home to the Sasktel Call Centre. The exterior finishes of the Modern Press Building were renovated in 2013 to match the Nexus Building's striking and elegant Dark Pearl granite and high polished stainless exterior, which depicts finishes more faithful to high quality art deco structures in New York and Chicago. All of the art deco details of the Modern Press Building were retained in a sensitive restoration that The Mid-West Group is well known for. The unified and dramatic structures of the Nexus Building and the Modern Press Building are prominent on the streetscape of Saskatoon's main downtown thoroughfare. The Modern Press Building's exterior was repainted to match that of the new structure.

In 2024, the Mid-West Group signed a 10-year lease with March Consulting Associates (MARCH) to be the anchor tenant of the building starting July 2025. MARCH is a is an outcome-driven engineering firm, headquartered in Saskatoon, with other offices in Regina and Calgary, with teams and projects all across Canada.
