= Peter Martin (photographer) =

Peter Martin is a Canadian-born photojournalist who works in Toronto, Montreal and spends part of the year in Annapolis, Maryland.

== Career ==
Peter's work has been published in numerous travel and news magazines (including Time, Newsweek, Maclean's, Sports Illustrated) and books including The Day in the Life of Canada, Day in the Life of the N.H.L. and The Ice Storm-An Historic Record of Photographs from January 1998.

Around 2018 he resigned from the Montreal Gazette where he was a staff photographer for 16 years. In 2014 he opened a studio and gallery in the 12th-century village of Stow-on-the-Wold, England

== Famous photos ==
Terry’s Journey, a photograph of Terry Fox taken during his Marathon of Hope, was chosen by Canada's National History Society as one of "10 images that changed Canada"
