= William DeKay =

Canadian photojournalist

William DeKay is a freelance Canadian photojournalist.

== Early life and education ==
DeKay was born in London, Ontario. He studied at Ryerson Polytechnical Institute in Toronto and interned at the National Geographic Society in Washington, D.C.

== Career ==
DeKay began his photojournalist career in 1983 at the London Free Press. He was on staff at the Detroit Free Press where he was the recipient of numerous regional and national photojournalism awards and honors, including being named a finalist for the Pulitzer Prize.

DeKay has participated in numerous magazine and book publishing projects including five A Day in the Life books. His publications have also appeared in Time, National Geographic, Newsweek, and Canadian Geographic.

He has traveled extensively throughout North America photographing rural settings and people. In 1997, DeKay authored the book Down Home: A Journey into Rural Canada, a collection of color photographs depicting the lives of Canadians living in the country.

DeKay was named "Photographer of the Year" by the American Agricultural Editors' Association from 2009 to 2012 and has won writing and photography awards from the Canadian Farm Writer's Federation. He is an editor at the Western Producer newspaper in Saskatoon, Saskatchewan.
