= The Western Producer =

Canadian agricultural newspaper

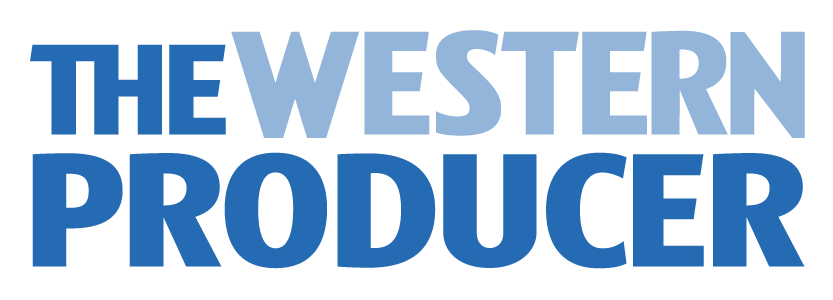
- Type: Weekly newspaper
- Format: Tabloid
- Owner: Glacier Media (via Glacier FarmMedia)
- Publisher: Shaun Jessome
- Editor: Robin Booker
- Founded: 24 August 1923
- Language: English
- Headquarters: Saskatoon, Saskatchewan, Canada
- ISSN: 0043-4094
- Website: producer.com

The Western Producer is a weekly agricultural newspaper based in Saskatoon, Saskatchewan, Canada. It covers farming news, commodity markets, and agricultural policy for readers across western Canada. It is the largest weekly agricultural publication of its type in Canada.

== History ==
Harris Turner and A.P. "Pat" Waldron founded the Saskatoon-based Modern Press publishing company in 1923. This followed the demise of Turner's previous venture, Turner's Weekly, which originated in 1918. Modern Press released its first issue of The Progressive on 24 August 1923. The following year the publication was renamed The Western Producer.

A major goal of the publication in its early years was to promote cooperative pooling among wheat farmers. The Saskatchewan Wheat Pool was founded in 1924 and purchased Modern Publishing in the early 1930s, supporting The Western Producer through the Great Depression. Until moving to its current location in the late 1990s, the newspaper operated out of the Modern Press Building in downtown Saskatoon.

In 2002, GVIC Communications purchased the publishing company from the Saskatchewan Wheat Pool. GVIC subsequently rebranded as Glacier Media, which remains the current owner of Western Producer Publications through its agricultural media subsidiary Glacier FarmMedia.

In December 2006, a fire broke out at the Saskatoon building housing the newspaper and its printing operations. Staff were evacuated and no one was injured; publication continued without interruption.

In January 2014, the newspaper's veteran parliamentary correspondent in Ottawa retired, drawing coverage from national outlets that noted the significance of the bureau to Canadian farm readers.

== Coverage and content ==
The Western Producer focuses on news relevant to western Canadian farmers, including commodity prices, federal and provincial agricultural policy, crop science, and rural community issues. Academic researchers have used the publication as a primary source for studying rural western Canadian society, including studies of gender and farm identity.
