= Galerie Youn =

Canadian art gallery

Coordinates: 45°31′26″N 73°35′42″W

- Established: 2013
- Location: Montreal, Canada
- Type: Contemporary art gallery
- Website: galerieyoun.com

Galerie Youn is an art gallery featuring up-and-coming Canadian and international artists in Montreal, Quebec, Canada, most of whom were discovered on Instagram. Originally established online as the Flying Rooster Contemporary Project (FRCP) in 2012, the gallery opened in 2013 as a brick and mortar location in Montreal's Mile End. Now located at 384 St. Paul Street West in the Old-Port's historical district (summer 2021), the gallery represents emerging and mid-career contemporary artists, typically half from Canada and half from the U.S., Europe and Asia. In 2021, the gallery received the "Best in the City" award from Time Out. Their book catalogues are part of the permanent collection of the Thomas J. Watson Library. The director and founder, Juno Youn, is a native of South Korea and a graduate of OCAD.

== History ==
The gallery was founded by South Korean-Canadian gallerist Juno Youn in May 2013 in Montreal. Youn was previously the co-founder of Spin Gallery, which ran from 1999 to 2007 in Toronto, Canada.

Focusing on a roster of twenty-four artists, Galerie Youn features Canadian and international young and mid-career artists from the United States, Europe and Asia.

The gallery's mission is to spot up-and-coming talents and bring them to a larger audience. The gallery has featured exhibitions of works by Hugo Alonso, whose art photograph was featured on the cover of The New York Times Magazine in October 2017.

The gallery also shows Canadian artist-illustrator Jay Dart, VOGUE Mexico photographer Damian Siqueiros, Vancouver artist Paul Morstad, and Peter Chan.

The gallery has participated in various art fairs, including Art on Paper in New York City, Art Toronto, Seattle Art Fair, Pulse Miami, FotoFever, and Drawing Now in Paris. In the Blouin ArtINFO market report for Art Basel Miami Beach 2018, it was mentioned that Galerie Youn “sold out very quickly, getting much attention throughout.”

In 2018, Youn was noted as one of Canada's Best Dressed in The Globe and Mail newspaper.
