= Rod MacIvor =

Rod MacIvor (born September 17, 1946 in New Glasgow, Nova Scotia, Canada) is a retired Canadian photojournalist.

== Career ==
MacIvor worked for Dominion Wide Photos/The Ottawa Journal for a year in 1965, then attended and graduated from Ryerson University 1966-69 in Photographic Arts. After working for United Press International from 1970 to 1980 as the Ottawa Newspictures Manager/Photographer, he joined the Ottawa Citizen as Assistant Director of Photography/Photographer, where he retired in 2007 after 42 years as a photojournalist at the age of 61.

When working for UPI, MacIvor worked with Margaret Trudeau, wife of then Canadian Prime Minister Pierre Trudeau, after she asked him to give her photo lessons. She later asked him to shoot their official 1976 Christmas Card photo at Harrington Lake, the Prime Minister's official country retreat. This was the last family Christmas card photo before the Trudeaus' separation. As UPI Ottawa photographer, MacIvor covered Royal Tours, election campaigns, events (including visits by Heads of State) on Parliament Hill and the Trudeaus' 1976 Cuban, Mexico and Venezuelan State visit. Prior to Pierre Trudeau's funeral in 2000, as his casket was leaving Parliament Hill after a lying-in-state ceremony, a distraught Margaret ran to MacIvor, who was covering the ceremony, and put her arms around him, crying. The photo was used in newspapers across the country.

After Mr. Trudeau's death, fifty of MacIvor's images of Pierre Trudeau and his family, taken between 1970-1980, were put together in an exhibit at the Phillip K. Wood Gallery in Almonte, ON (2001) and attracted 20,000 visitors on a cross Canada tour, raising $20,000 for Prostate Cancer Research. Margaret Trudeau, who attended the exhibit, praised MacIvor's photos "Rod captured the intimate side of Pierre Trudeau, without sensationalism--the reality, not the weakness, the best, not the worst," she said.

=== Awards ===
MacIvor is the winner of various awards including:

- two National Newspaper Awards (NNA) in 1973 (Feature photo/Trudeau and Justin) and 2005 (Special Project category/Palliative care series) and a NNA Nomination/Citation of Merit in 1992 (black and white Feature photo of a local farmer bringing in Hay the "Old Fashioned Way/horse and wagon");
- the Canadian Press News Photo of the Year in 1999 (Police memorial service, Policeman's mother crying on her son's Hat (he was killed while on duty));
- an Award of Excellence in 2005 from the Society for News Design (Sports photo of two thousand swimmers, only their heads emerging from a calm Mirror Lake in Lake Placid, waiting for the beginning of Ironman USA Triathlon).
- October 1970 winner of CP photo of the Month (series of photos of Jean Chrétien [then Indian Affairs Minister in Trudeau's cabinet] falling on his head in a bicycle race);
- Ontario News Photographers Assoc, Nikon 1985 Feature photo of the year award (weather photo of little girl swimming under water);
- 2007 PX3 Prix de la Paris Public Choice award (Dragonboat ladies team in action);
- 2008 PX3 'Water' Competition with over 2,000 swimmers waiting for start of Ironman USA Lake Placid;
- two '2009 Px3 Prix de la Paris' annual awards with photos of 30,000 Sandpipers migrating thru the Bay of Fundy (HM) and photo of Antelope Slot Canyon interior (HM) near Page, Arizona."

== Famous photos ==
"Trudeau carrying Justin under his arm", showing Trudeau arriving (1973) at Government House for a Garden Party that he hosted for Commonwealth Heads of State, his son Justin Trudeau under his arm like a football, being saluted by a Royal Canadian Mounted Police (RCMP) officer in dress uniform, was selected in the top ten of 100 Photos That Changed Canada, a hard cover coffee-table book sponsored by Canada's National History Society that will be published in November 2009. Judges said the photo "reflected Mr. Trudeau's image as a family man ... tak[ing] you back to a time and a place and a memory" of the Trudeau era and "captures the essence of Trudeau's charisma and confidence during this stage of his career."

The Trudeau photo also won the 1973 National Newspaper Award for best Feature Photo of the year and was chosen as the cover photo for the National Newspaper Awards committee's 50th anniversary book over all other 150 winning photos during the 50 years. The judges called it "a very unusual photo of a very important man."

UPI included this photo (Trudeau carrying Justin under his arm, as Mountie salute) as one of the top 50 'Iconic Photos of the 20th Century....

The Trudeau and Justin photo was also chosen by Nancy Southam and McClelland & Stewart for the cover of their book titled "Pierre" 2005. Southam gathered 150 reminiscences and anecdotal narratives about Trudeau from all over the globe. To use the photo as its original horizontal shape, it was agreed to extend it onto the back cover (in order to keep the RCMP salute).

The photo was also included in a book featuring approx 258 classic photos from the worldwide UPI Newspictures files, titled "Picture This!" by Gary Haynes, Bullfinch Press, 2006.
