= Lana Šlezić =

Canadian photographer and filmmaker

Lana Šlezić is a Canadian photographer and filmmaker.

== Life and education ==
Šlezić was born in Toronto, Ontario, to parents from Croatia. She grew up in Port Credit in Mississauga, Ontario. Šlezić's parents have inspired her work in many ways. Her father was an amateur photographer, and introduced Šlezić to the art, by providing her with her first camera. Šlezić's work has also been inspired by her mother's eccentric and flamboyant personality. In addition, having parents who immigrated to Canada provided her with a perspective of what it is like to be an outsider, which is a major theme in her work.

Šlezić attended Western University in London, Ontario and obtained an Honours Bachelor of Arts degree in Kinesiology. She then went on to receive a Diploma in Photojournalism from Loyalist College in Belleville, Ontario. Šlezić graduated from Loyalist College in 2000.

== Work ==
=== Photojournalism ===
In the past, Šlezić worked as a freelance photojournalist. Her work has been published in three continents, under titles such as TIME Magazine, The New York Times, and Chatelaine. Additionally, Šlezić regularly worked with publications such as the Toronto Star and The Globe and Mail. She has also contributed to Canadian Magazine, The Walrus.

Šlezić is known for making very beautiful work that also has content and meaning. She aims to tell a story through her work, and feels that it is rewarding when her audience understands the meaning behind her work. Šlezić says that she creates the idea of a photo in her head, and waits for it to occur in life so that she can capture it. She notes that this approach to photography relies on patience, luck, uncertainty, and chance. For Šlezić, the most important aspect of her work is staying connected to her subject matter.

In March 2004, Šlezić travelled to Afghanistan for a six-week magazine assignment. She was covering a story for Canadian Geographic on Afghan Women. Working on this story, she became fascinated with Afghanistan, but did not have freedom to explore the land. Being restricted and unable to travel throughout Afghanistan provided her with insight into the real situation that Afghan women face. This led her to extend her trip and stay in Afghanistan for two years. She decided to extend her trip to tell the stories of these women. For Šlezić, visiting Afghanistan became more than just a photojournalism assignment. She completely devoted herself to the oppression Afghan women face so that she could accurately convey its importance.

The Taliban fell in 2001, and it was assumed that the oppressive conditions for women had improved at this time, however Šlezić found that this was not the case. Upon arriving in Afghanistan, Šlezić discovered that many women were still facing oppressive situations such as forced marriage, forced prostitution, domestic violence, lack of education, and being forced to wear a burka. Most of the women Šlezić met during her time in Afghanistan had encountered a basic lack of freedom. Šlezić felt very naïve at her assumption that this problem had been dramatically improved, and set out to inform others of the reality of the situation. Šlezić's work calls for global attention to ideas of patriarchy, freedom, and control within Afghanistan.

=== Forsaken: Afghan Women ===
Šlezić created a photo book entitled, Forsaken: Afghan Women, that was curated from thousands of photos that she took during her time in Afghanistan. Forsaken has been published in five countries. It is a compilation of 60 images of women who have been negatively impacted by Afghanistan's social and political state. The photos in Forsaken are interspersed with texts about the oppression that these women face. The images and text in Forsaken are emotional and powerful. To take these photos, Šlezić shot in colour and used a Nikon D100 and a Nikon D2X. Šlezić was accompanied by a translator and was able to unobtrusively speak with, and photograph, the women she encountered. She was warmly welcomed by the Afghan women she met. They enjoyed having their photos taken and being able to share their stories with other women.

Through Forsaken, Šlezić attempts to reveal the shocking truth that Afghanistan is very far from being free of patriarchal oppression. The disparity between the media's presentation of Afghanistan and the reality of daily life motivated Šlezić to create Forsaken. Šlezić aims to convey that conditions for Afghan women have not drastically improved, and these women need help. She intends to create an honest and explicit depiction of these conditions. Within Forsaken, Šlezić highlights the stories of women who lit themselves on fire to escape their devastating situations. This is not an uncommon occurrence, and demonstrates the desperation that these women feel as well as their desire to be free. The images displayed in Forsaken are an artful depiction of defiant femininity within an oppressive and devastating war zone. Šlezić does not believe the conditions for Afghan women will change soon, but calls for attention to this issue through Forsaken.

=== The Voice ===
In 2015, Šlezić created a short documentary entitled, "The Voice". This thirteen-minute film is about retired CBC Radio celebrity, Andy Barrie, documenting his experience with Parkinson's disease. "The Voice" chronicles Barrie's life before and after his diagnosis, both before and after he undergoes treatment. Šlezić accounts his experience as he undergoes a new treatment called Deep Brain Stimulation. Barrie underwent this treatment for two and a half years. It is only successful in 20 percent of people, and fortunately was successful for Barrie. Šlezić documented Barrie's improvement with this treatment and noted that the difference she saw was incredible. Creating this film was both a professional and personal experience for Šlezić. She notes that it was difficult to separate her emotions from the filmmaking process, but ultimately she had to put emotions aside and continue filming.

== Exhibitions ==
Šlezić's photography has been shown internationally in Croatia, Turkey, North America, and Europe. Below is a selection of Šlezić's documented exhibitions.

- Perception, Toronto, Ontario 2006
- Afghan Women "Never Conquered," Montréal, Québec 2005
- Time Stands Still, Toronto, Ontario 2004
- Kites, Guns and Dreams Exhibition, Vancouver, British Columbia 2004
- Landmine Victims, Toronto, Ontario 2003
- Homeless, Toronto, Ontario 2002
- Mennonites, Toronto, Ontario 2001

== Feminism ==
Šlezić's work related to feminism because it aims to enlighten outsiders of the oppression that certain populations, particularly Afghan women, face. Through her work, Šlezić aims to educate individuals about the devastation and injustices of a war-torn country such as Afghanistan. Her work recognizes the pain that others face, and calls attention to this issue. Šlezić's primary goal is to educate people and spread the truth about this injustice. This is because the oppressive conditions Afghan women endure creates a much larger issue than it is widely believed to be and it has not considerably improved. Šlezić advocates for the liberty of Afghan women, noting that their oppression is rooted in tradition and religion. She intends to bring awareness to this issue, and calls for action through her work. She creates a discourse noting that Afghan women are extremely knowledgeable about their oppressive situations, but they need help to be liberated from oppression. Šlezić places an emphasis on revealing that Afghan women feel angry and defiant in their current situation, rather than hopeless. She aims to point out the lack of freedom and control that Afghan women have. They need help, but do not need to be saved, and Šlezić aims to bring attention to this. She provides oppressed Afghan women with a voice and calls for liberty for these women.

== Awards and recognition ==
In 2005, Šlezić came in first place in the Photojournalism and Photo Essay category at the National Magazine Awards. Her winning photo depicts Canadian soldiers in Afghanistan and is entitled, "Operation Kabul." Also in 2005, Šlezić won the World Press Joop Swart Masterclass Award, and won Gold at the International Summit Creative Awards . In 2006, Šlezić won a Lucie Award for her photo of a female sex worker in Afghanistan. In addition, Šlezić received 2nd place in the International Photo Awards in Professional Editorial Category as well as the Professional People/ Culture Category in 2006.
