= Michoacán Market =

Food market in Condesa, Mexico City

Coordinates: 19°24′40.89″N 99°10′28.22″W

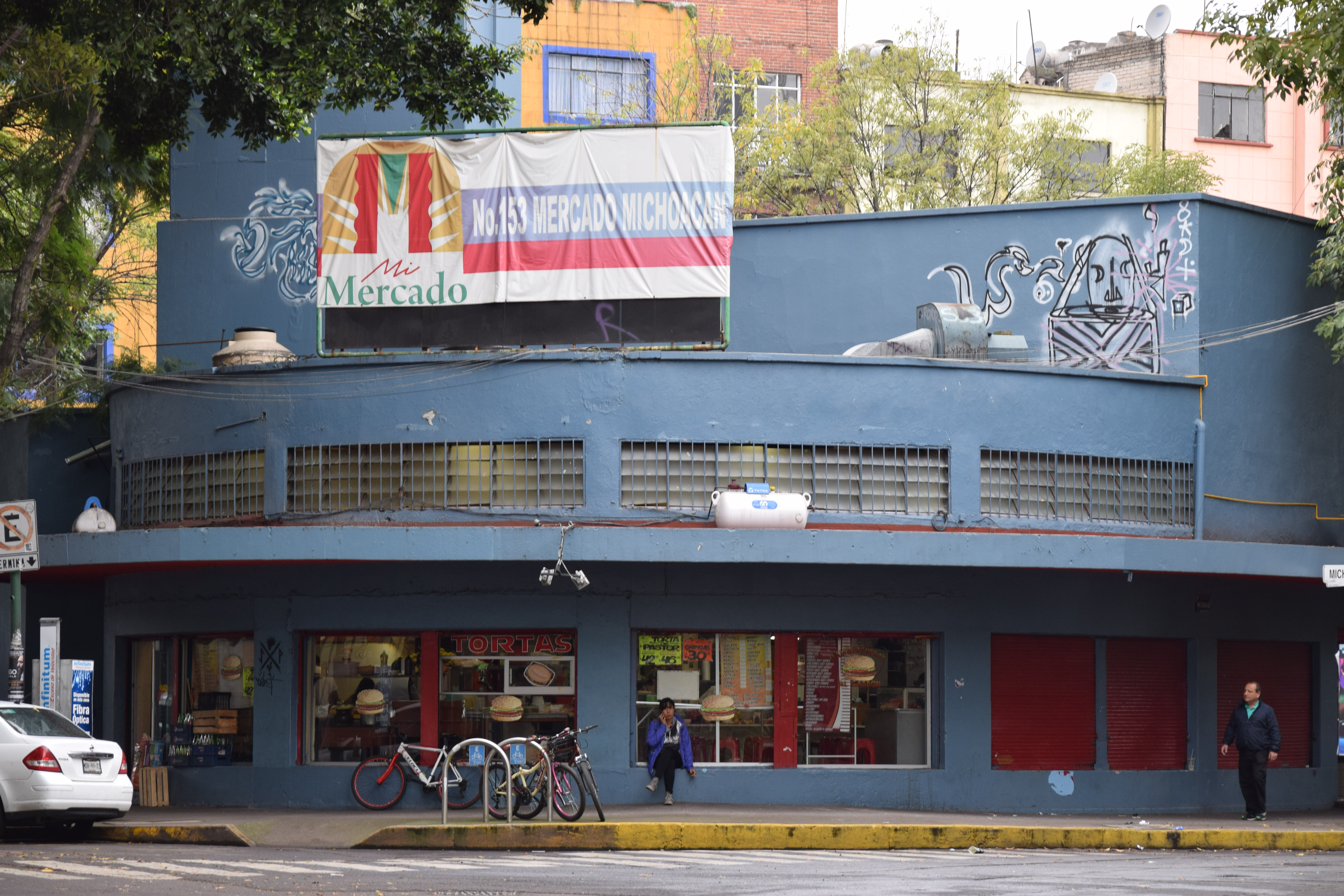
- Michoacán Market facade detail
- Location: Condesa, Mexico City, Mexico
- Opening date: 1946
- Goods sold: Food
- Days normally open: Daily
- Number of tenants: 27
- Total retail floor area: 360 square metres (3,900 sq ft)
- Parking: None
- Interactive map of Michoacán Market

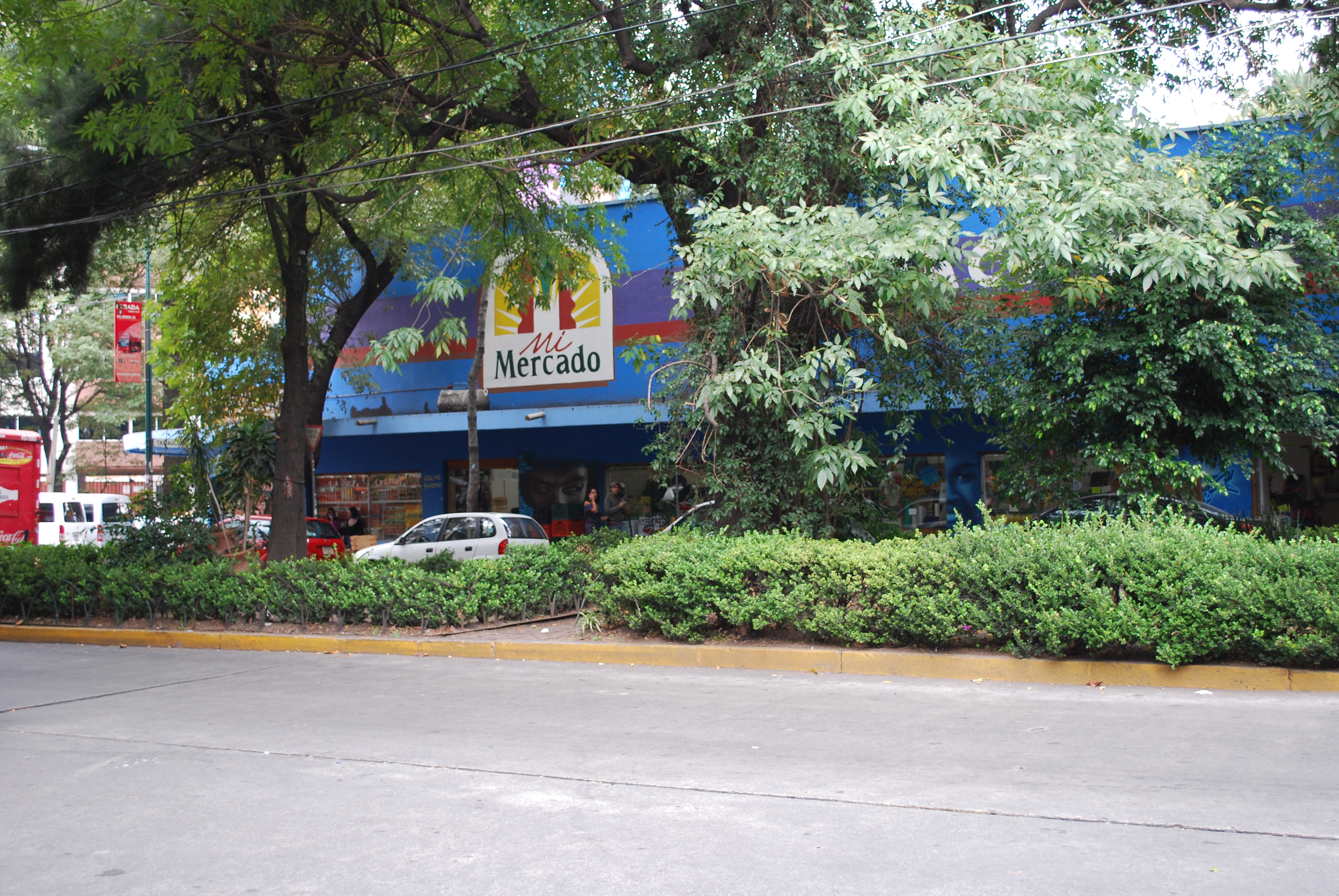
Michoacán Market, behind street trees

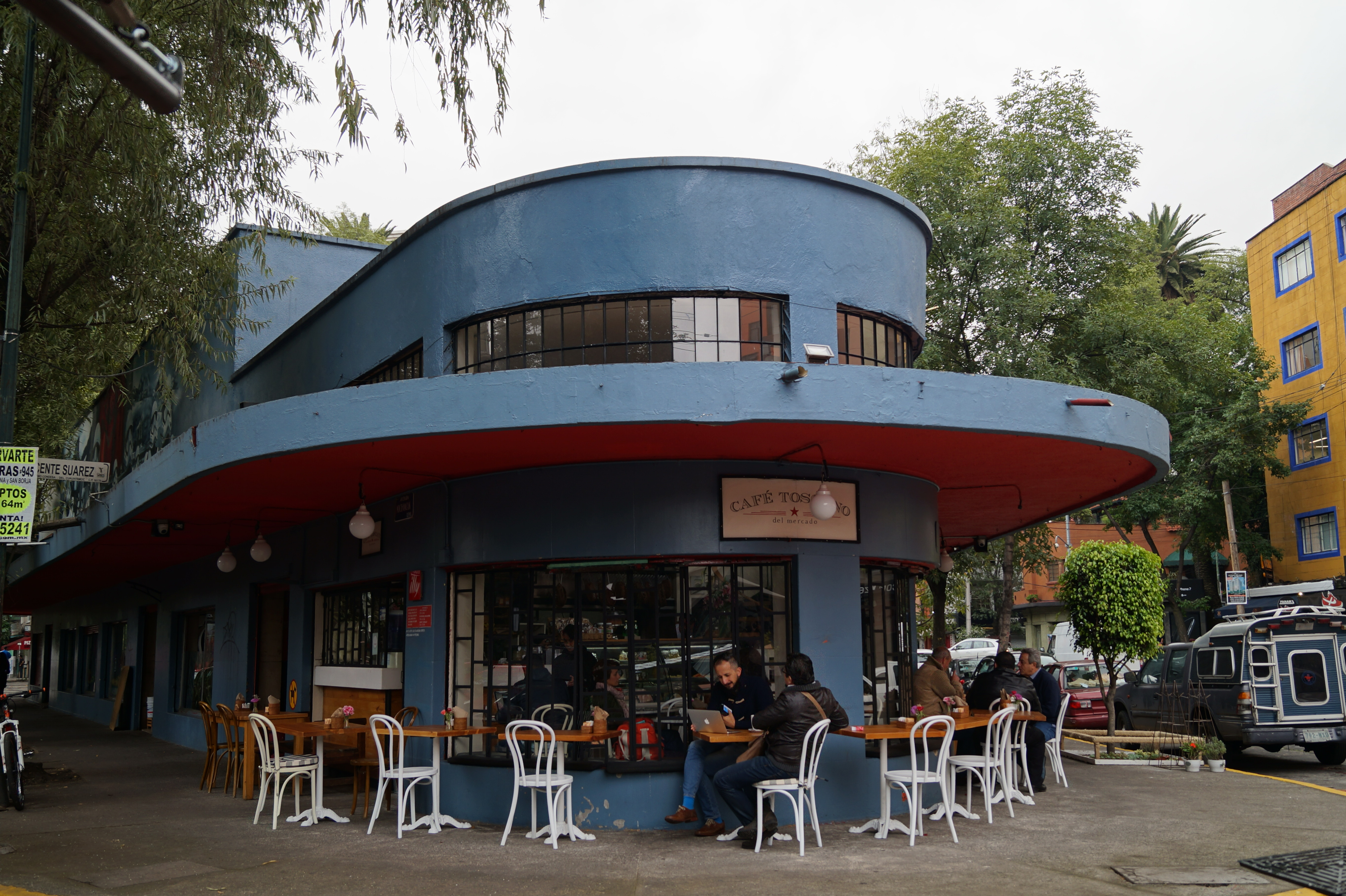
Food stand and Functionalist style building

The Michoacán Market is a traditional retail food market located in Condesa, one of the more prestigious districts of Mexico City. It is located between Avenida Michoacán, Avenida Vicente Suárez, and Avenida Tamaulipas streets, where three intersect.

The Michoacán Market is considered to be “the heart of La Condesa. It is the only mercado that provides service to the 3 colonias (official neighborhoods) of the Condesa district: Colonia Condesa, Colonia Hipódromo, and Colonia Hipódromo Condesa .

The market is small and frequented by the residents and restaurateurs of Condesa, one of the major artistic and commercial areas of the city. The market is located among boutiques, restaurants and bars, with the streets around the market are usually jammed with cars. These are mostly residential neighborhoods, with some office buildings. They are considered to be cosmopolitan structures in style, with Art Deco and other styles from the 1930s and 1940s, and a number of more modern structures. It is an upper income area, although it has had problems associated with urban decay, and earthquake damage vulnerability such as from the 1985 Mexico City earthquake and 2017 Central Mexico earthquake.

== History ==
The market was created in 1946. The building was designed in the Functionalist style of Modernist architecture. It was considered a modern and European based style, with design elements distinctive from much of Early 20th century Mexican architecture including, the use of steel and concrete, lightweight walls, the absence of ornamentation in both the interiors spaces and exterior facades, and large windows.

In 2008, the facades were decorated with public art murals, using stencils created by artists Saner of Mexico City and Sam Flores from San Francisco, as an example of street art. Saner stated he was interested in doing the work for people who did not generally go to art galleries. Apolinar Molina, a leader of the merchants of the market, stated that the artwork has generated more sales. The idea to add the artwork came from Liliana Carpinteyro, Arturo Mizrahi, and Christina Lourenco, creators of a project called Elaboratorio Urban&Arte Fashion Gallery. In 2008, the city proposed a plan that would partially close off Avenida Michoacán and convert the market into a cultural forum. However, this plan was rejected by area residents. In 2013, the Condesa pocket park was created on land that was formerly part of the intersection of Avenida Michoacán and Avenida Vicente Suárez.

== Description ==
The market building covers 360 square metres (3,900 ft^{2}), almost the entire lot, so there is no parking and no green spaces except for a few trees, planters, and benches on the sidewalk in front of the building. Inside there are twenty seven active stands averaging about 4.6 square metres (50 ft^{2}) each. Eight other spaces are used for storage, offices and other purposes. Most of the space inside the building is taken up by primary and secondary passageways.

Most of the light inside is natural, coming from the large windows; however, the design of the building impedes air circulation. The vendors in the market do not live in the Condesa area.

=== Customers ===
There are middle class customers who come into the area each day to work. While the market was designed to sell foodstuffs retail, most of its sales are to the many restaurants which are located in this area as well as those who pass through. Although most buyers are from restaurants, they do not purchase here in bulk as they have other sources for this. Much of the purchase is fruits and vegetables to supplements their basic stock. The rest of the clientele consists of older housewives who do weekly shopping and passers-by who generally frequent prepared food stands.

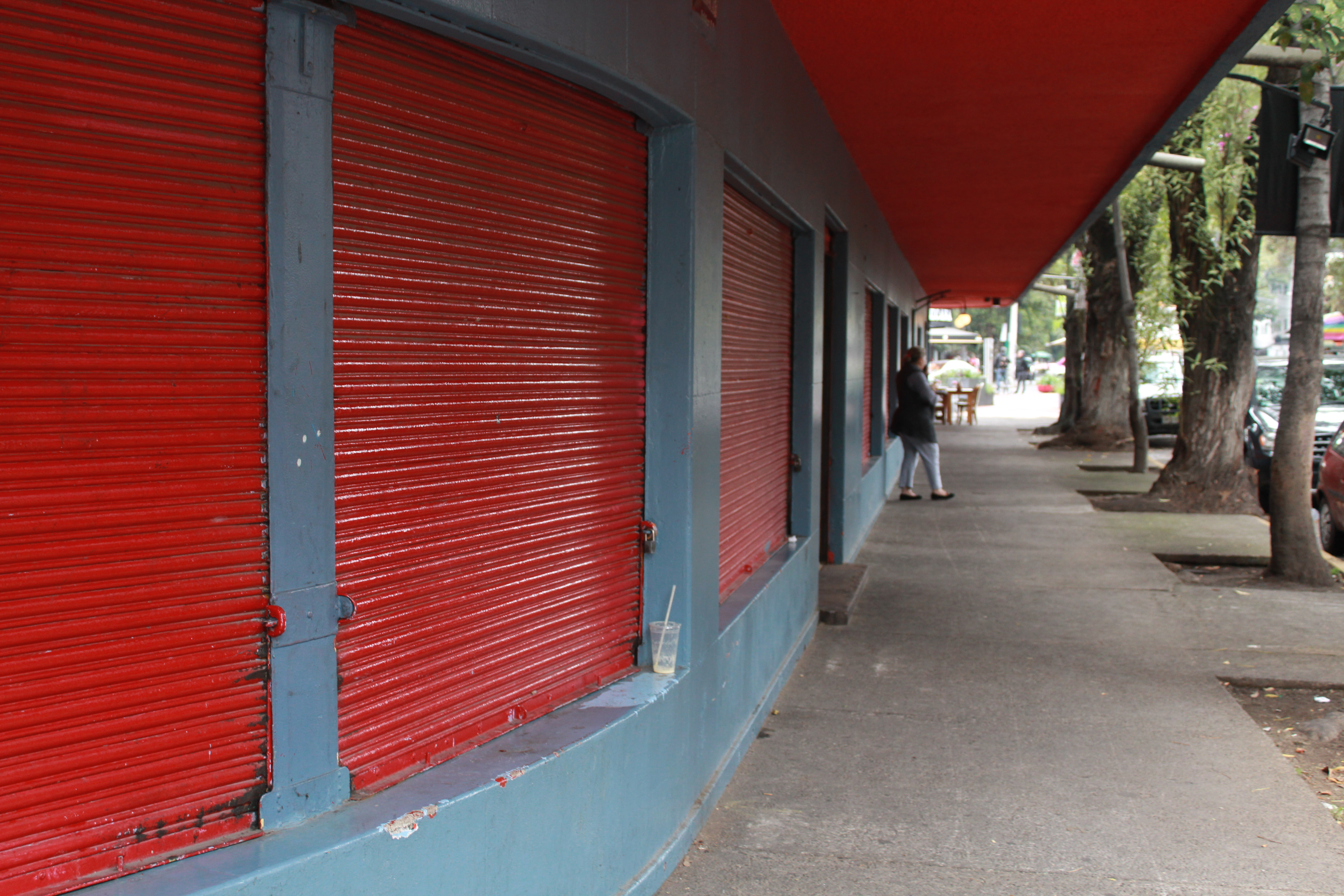
Shops with closed doors on sidewalk

=== Food stands ===
The outer stalls of the market, especially at its narrowest corner are mostly dominated by these food stands. These stands, mostly selling typical Mexican street food, contrast with the finer restaurants and bistros on the surrounding streets. There are a number of food stands that stand out such as the one that specializes in charcoal grilled giant hamburgers. One longtime stand, popular since the early 2000s, is Al Zorzal. It sells Argentinean food such as choripán, an Argentinean sausage with a condiment called chimichurri on a bun. One advantage of these stand is that its prices are more reasonable than many other Argentinean restaurants in the city.

== See also ==
- Condesa topics
