= Basurto Building =

- Edificio Basurto
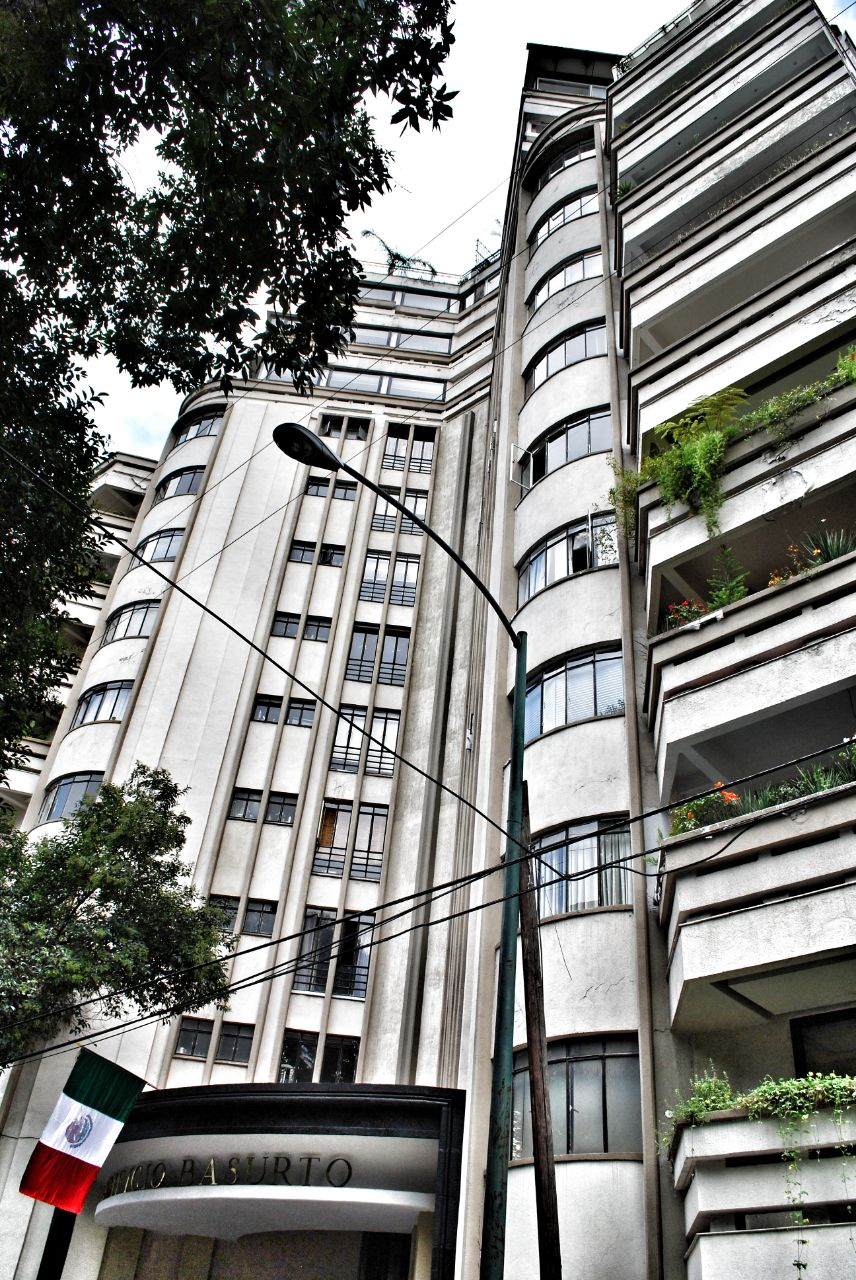

General information
- Type: Residential condominium
- Architectural style: Late or Post-Art Deco
- Location: Avenida México 187, Colonia Hipódromo, Condesa, Cuauhtémoc borough, Mexico City, Mexico
- Coordinates: 19.4138026°N 99.1698783°W
- Construction started: 1940
- Completed: 1945

Technical details
- Floor count: 14

Design and construction
- Architect: Francisco J. Serrano

The Basurto Building (Edificio Basurto) is located in the Condesa area of Mexico City, a work of architect Francisco J. Serrano, built between 1940 and 1945. Its design is post- Art Deco. It is fourteen storeys tall, unusually high for the constructions in the area of that period giving it iconic status and an emblem of Condesa. It is located on Avenida México, half a block from Parque México to the south and Plaza Popocatépetl to the north.

== Gallery ==
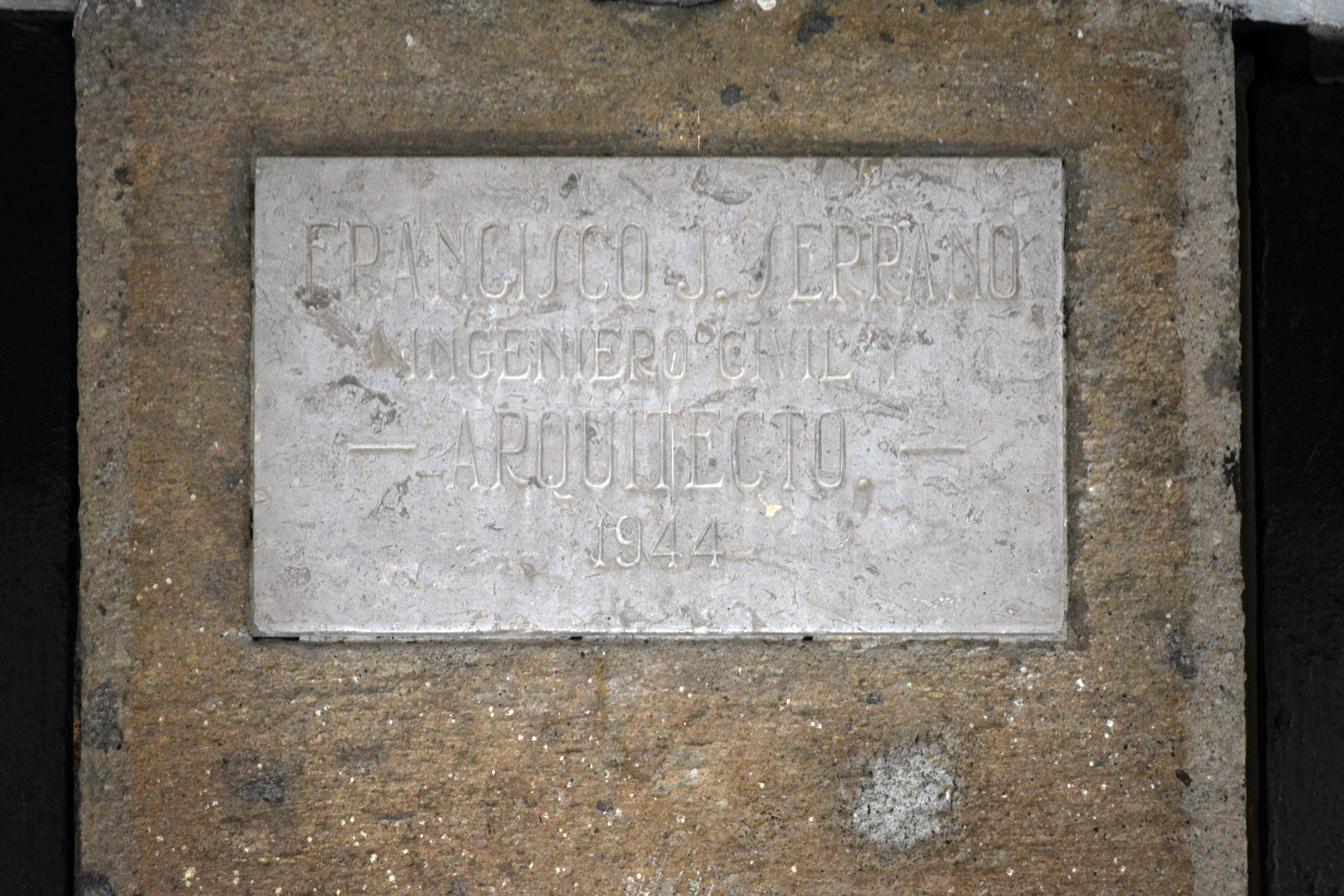
Plaque attesting that Serrano was the architect

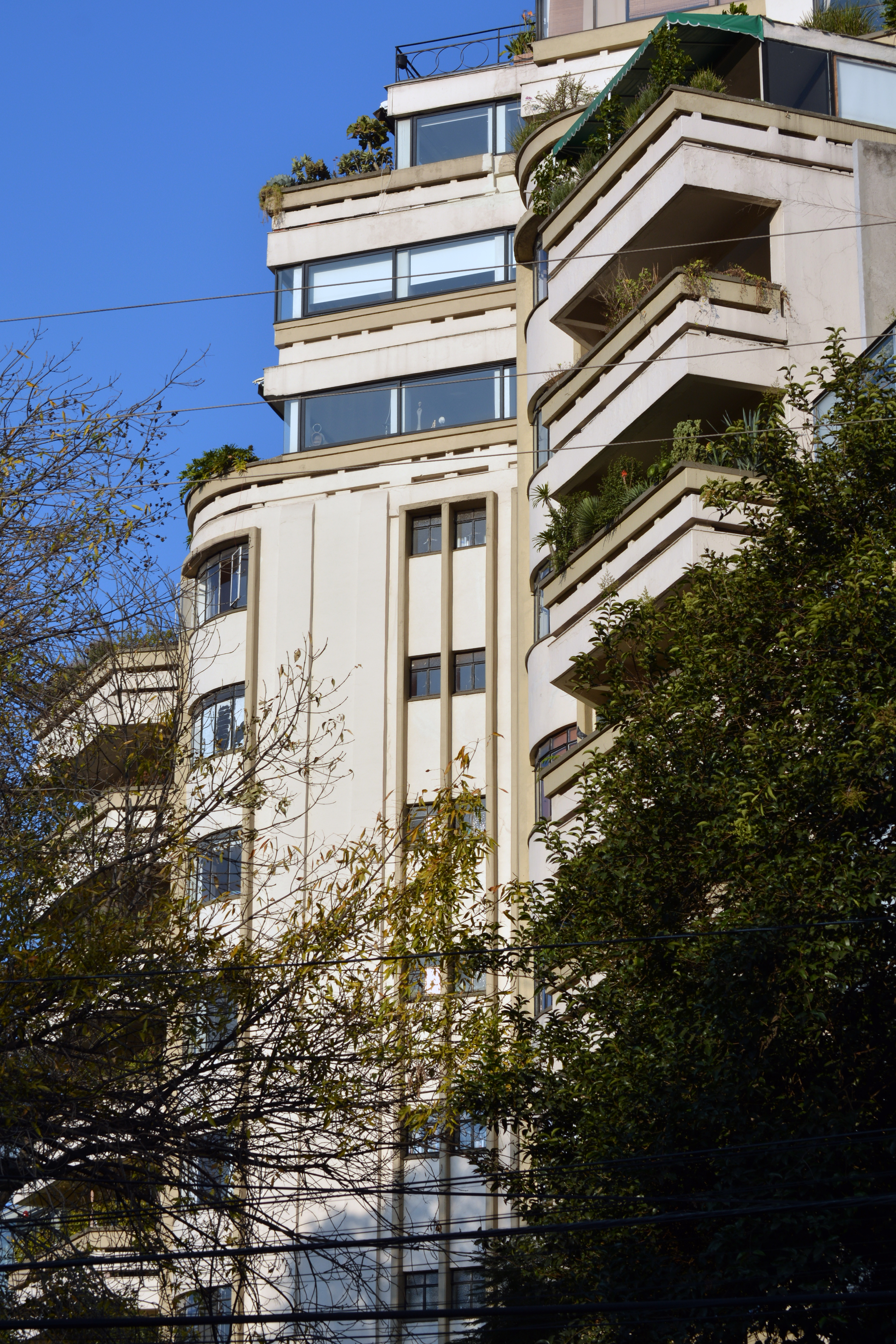
Another view of the façade
