= Amsterdam Avenue =

Amsterdam Avenue may refer to:

- Tenth Avenue (Manhattan), New York City, U.S.
- Amsterdam Avenue (Mexico City), Mexico
