= Condesa =

- Neighborhood of Mexico City
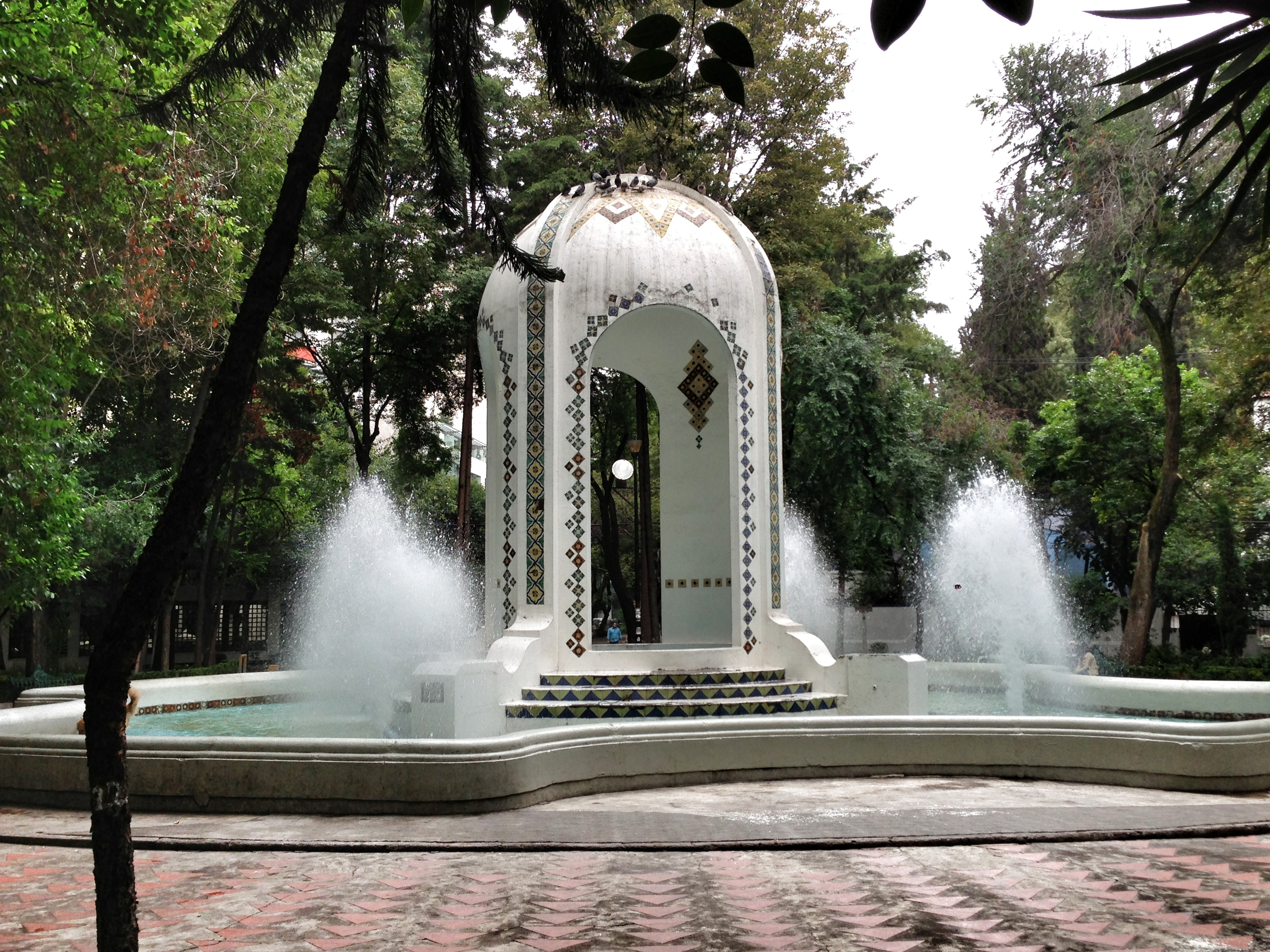
- Fountain at Plaza Popocatépetl

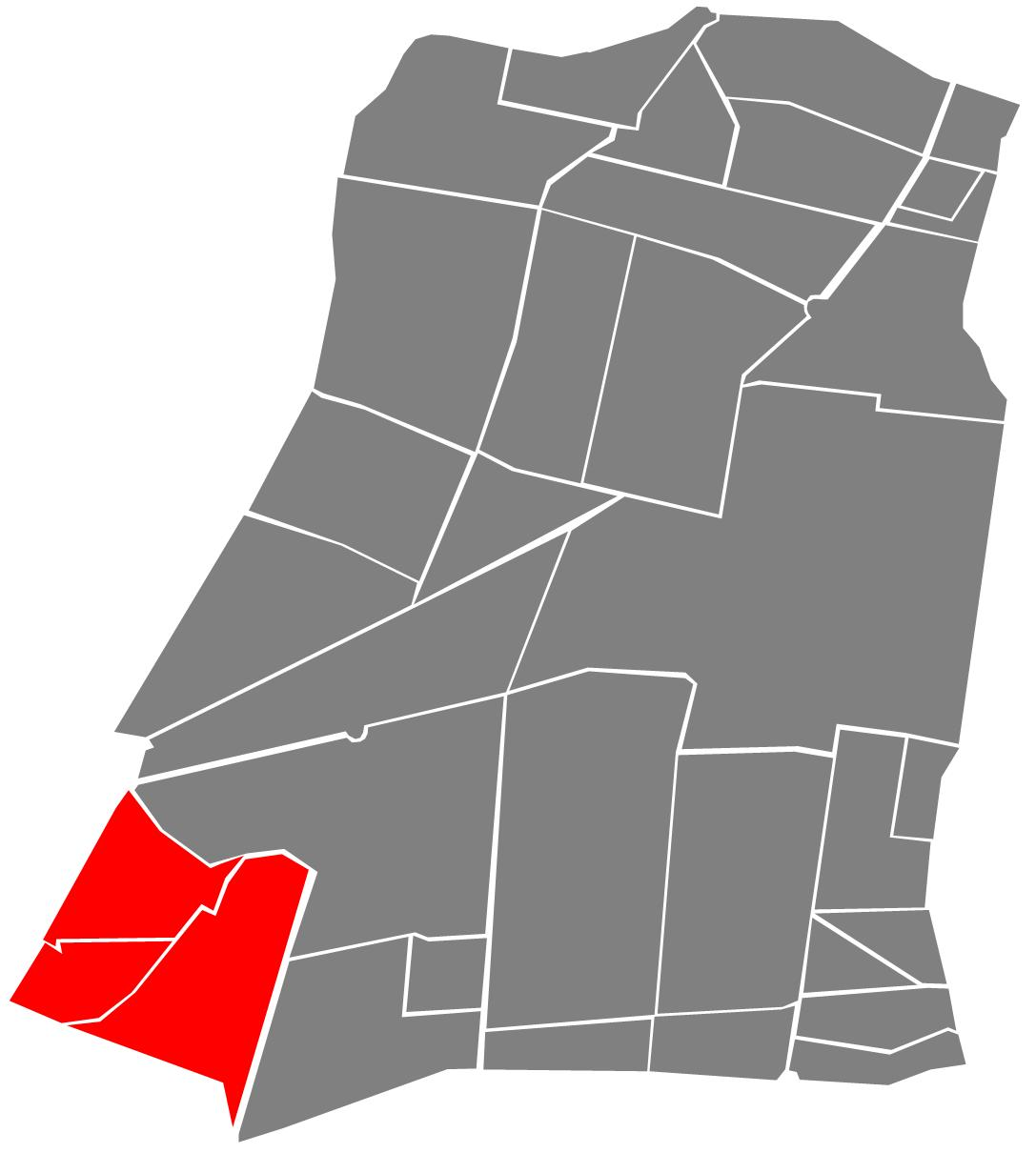
- Map of neighborhoods in Cuauhtémoc borough with the three Condesa colonias in red
- Location in Mexico City
- Coordinates: 19°24′45.09″N 99°10′9.92″W
- Country: Mexico
- City: Mexico City
- Borough: Cuauhtémoc

Population (2010)
  - Total: 25,229 (Hipódromo 13,572; Condesa 8,453; Hipódromo Condesa 3,204)
- Source: Cuauhtémoc borough
- Postal code: 06140 (Col. Condesa); 06100 (Col. Hipódromo); 06170 (Col. Hipódromo Condesa)

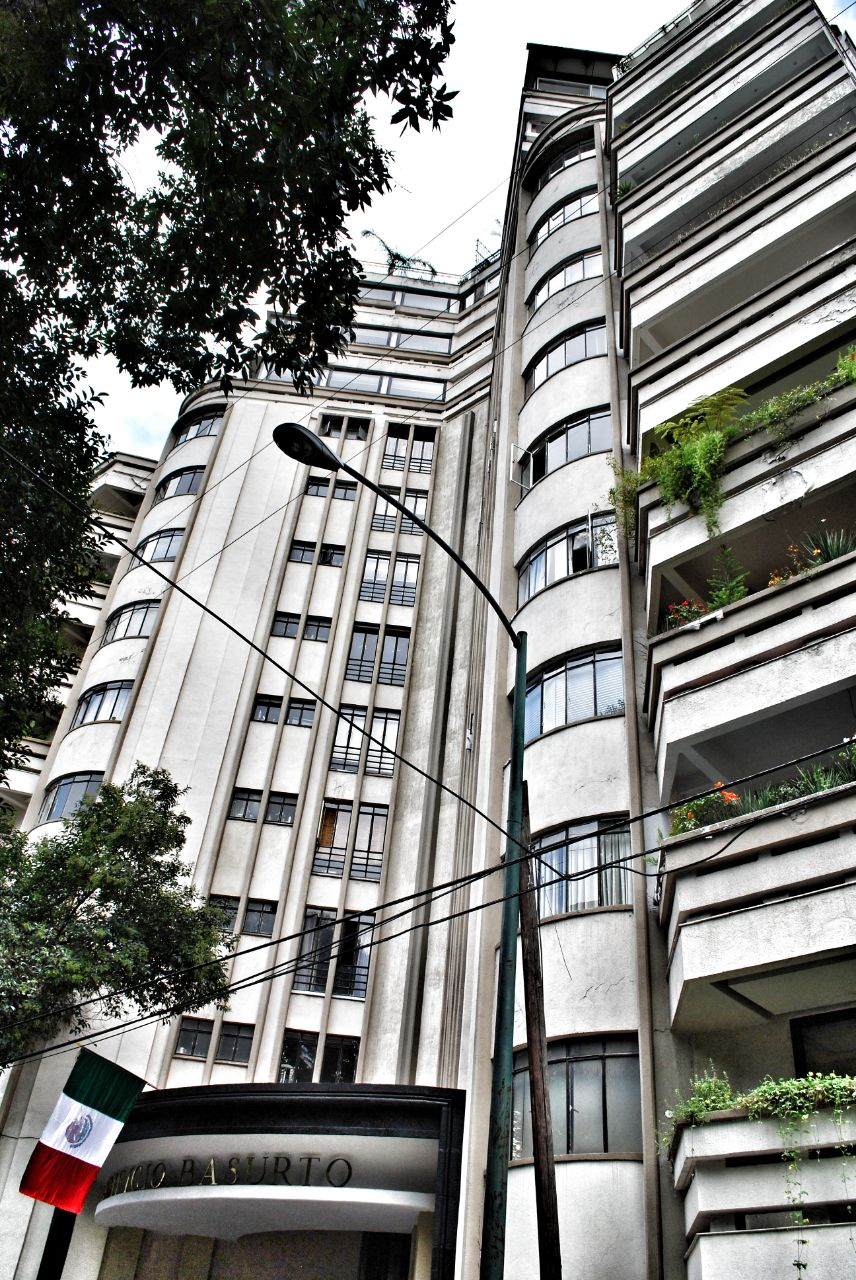
Basurto Building

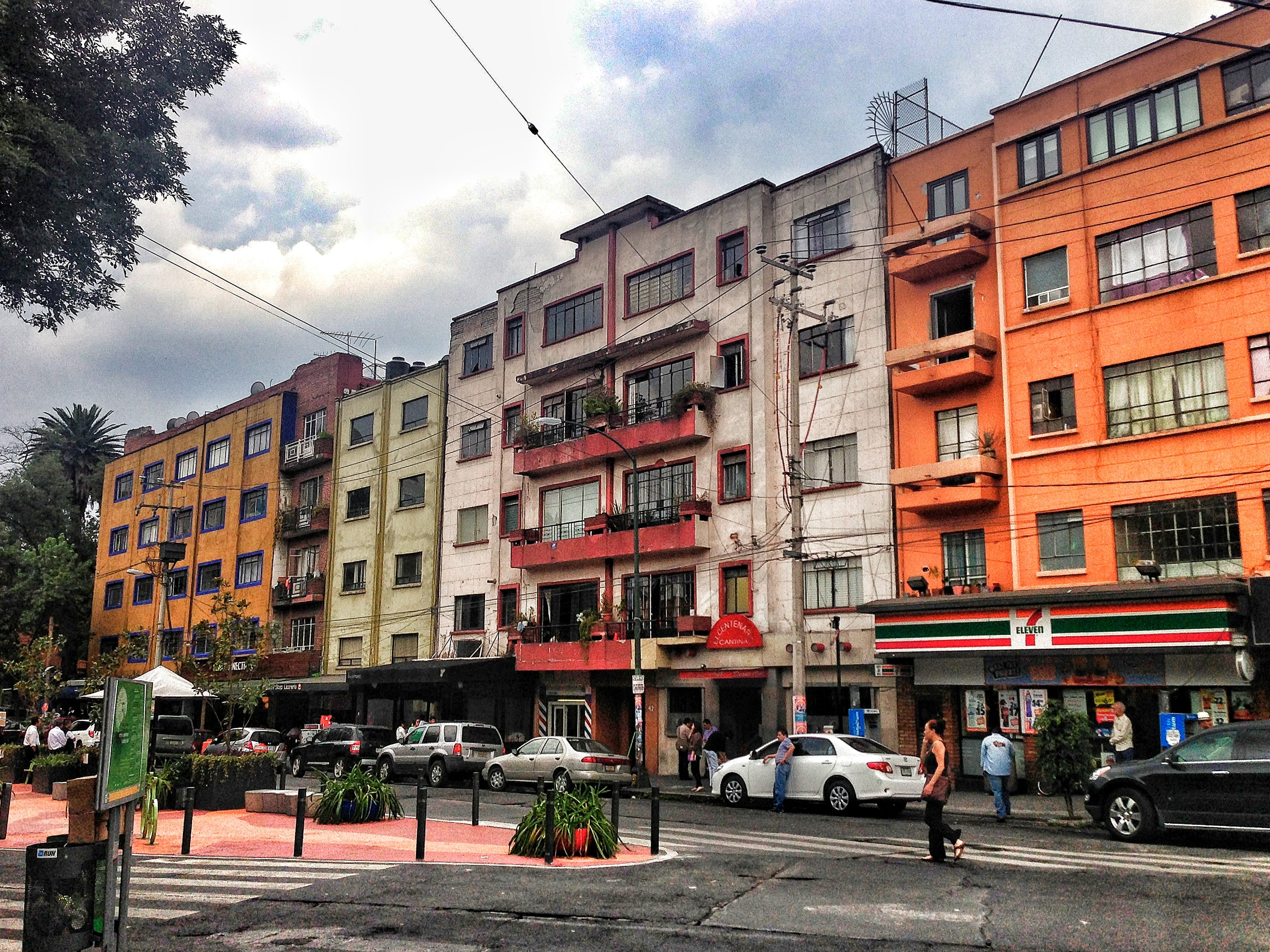
Av. Vicente Suárez looking east from Av. Michoacán and Calle Atlixco

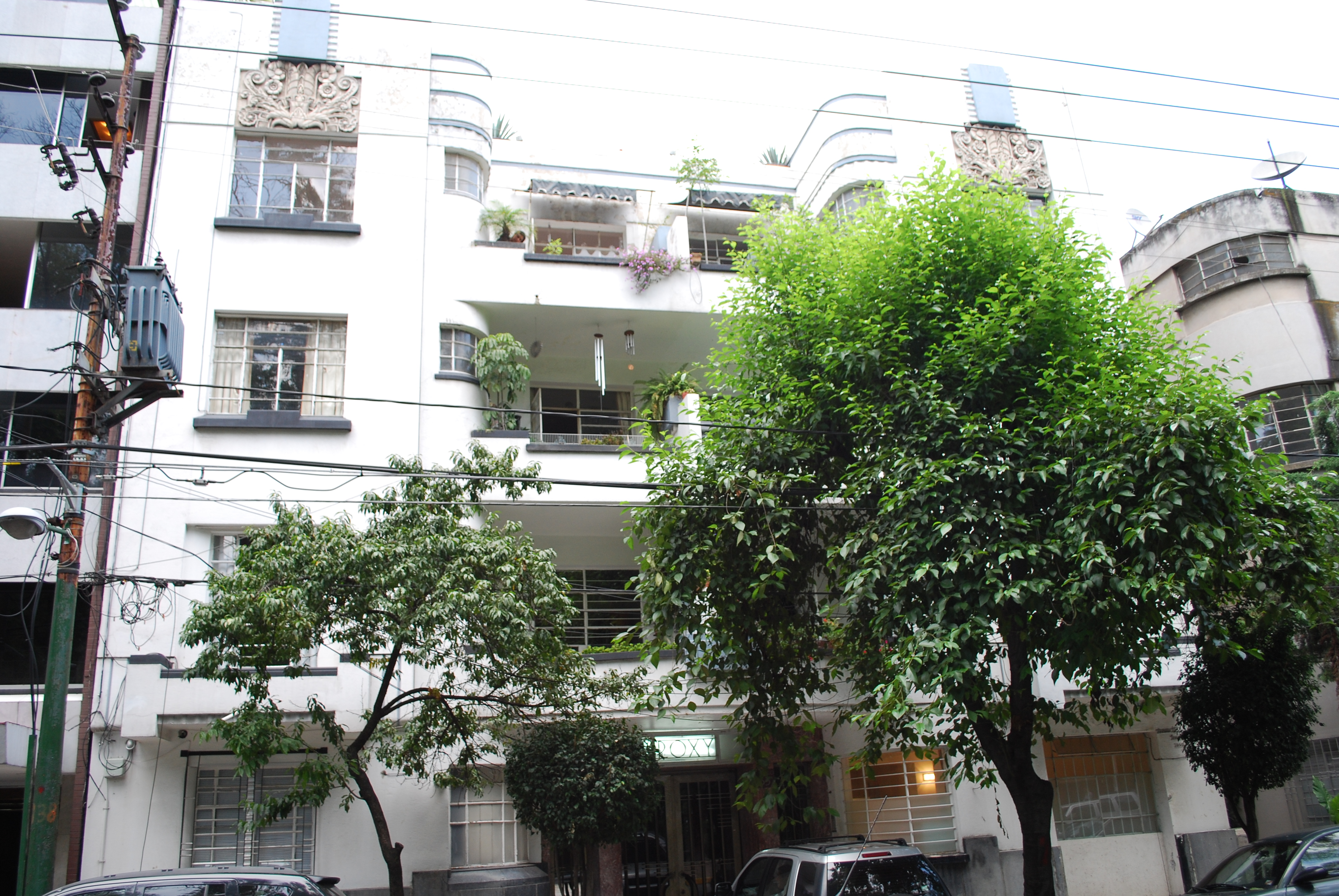
Art Deco influence in the neighborhood

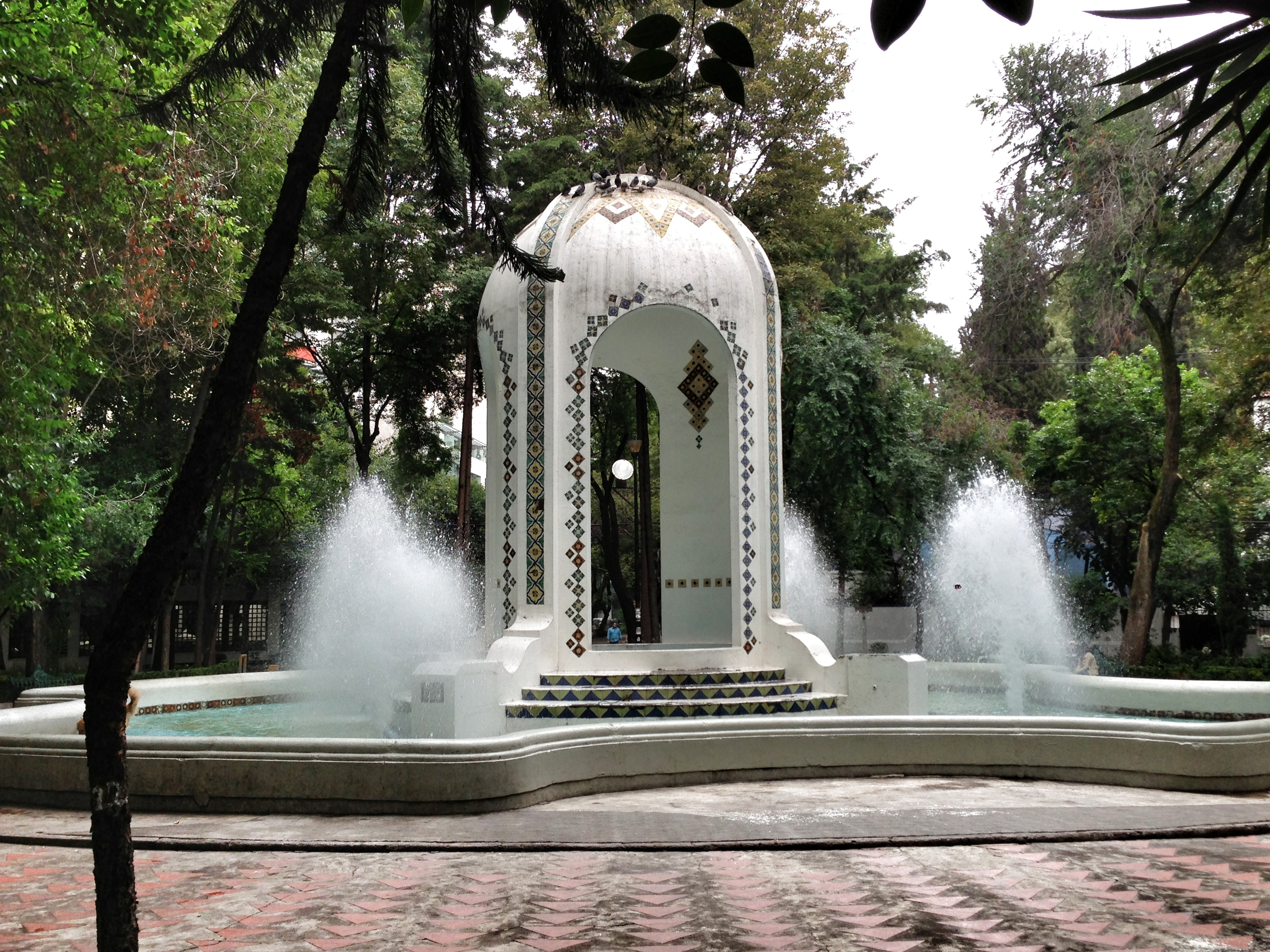
Fountain at Plaza Popcatépetl

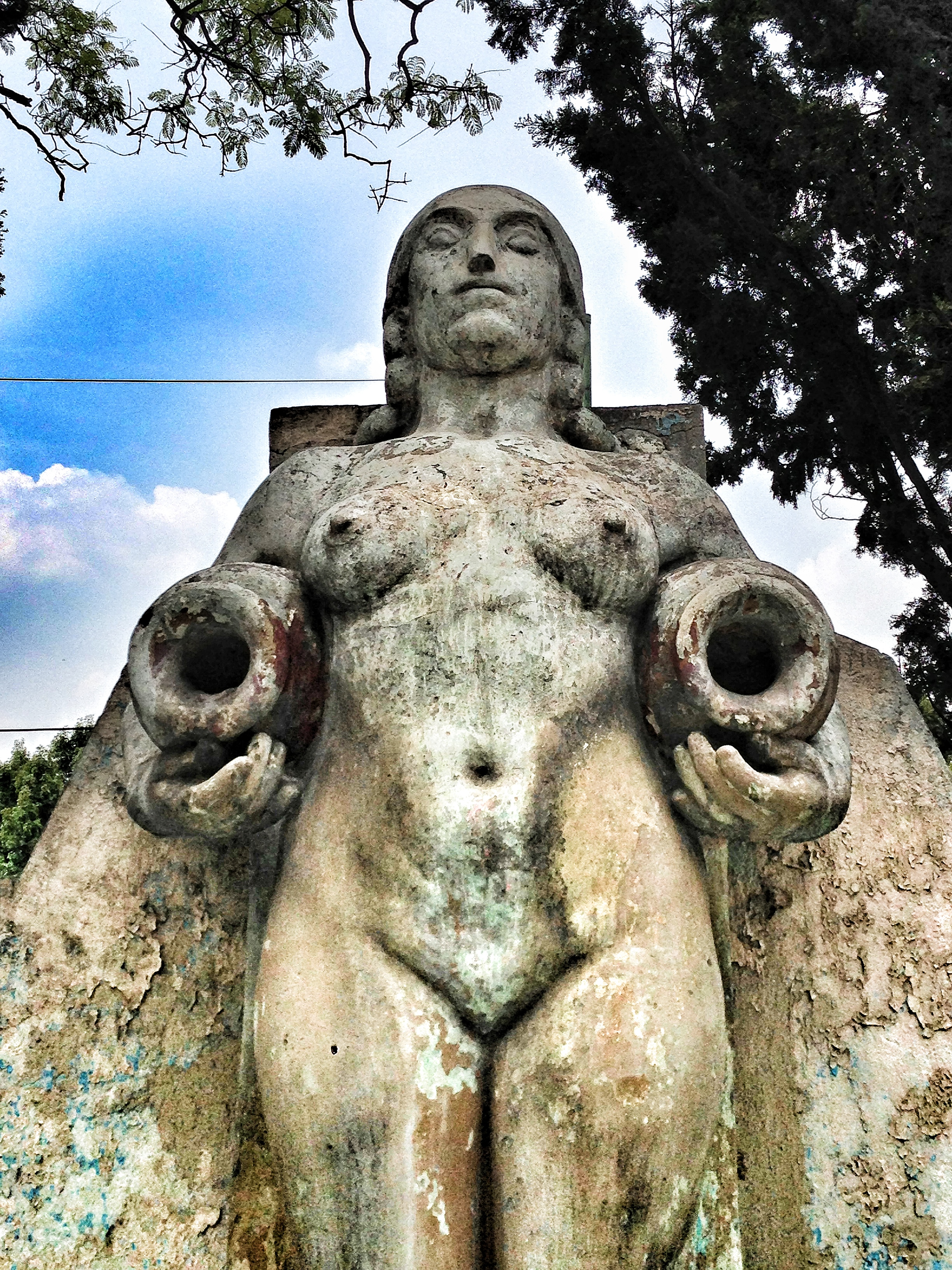
"Fuente de los Cántaros" fountain in Parque México. Luz Jiménez was the model, a symbol of "mexicanidad" or Mexican-ness.

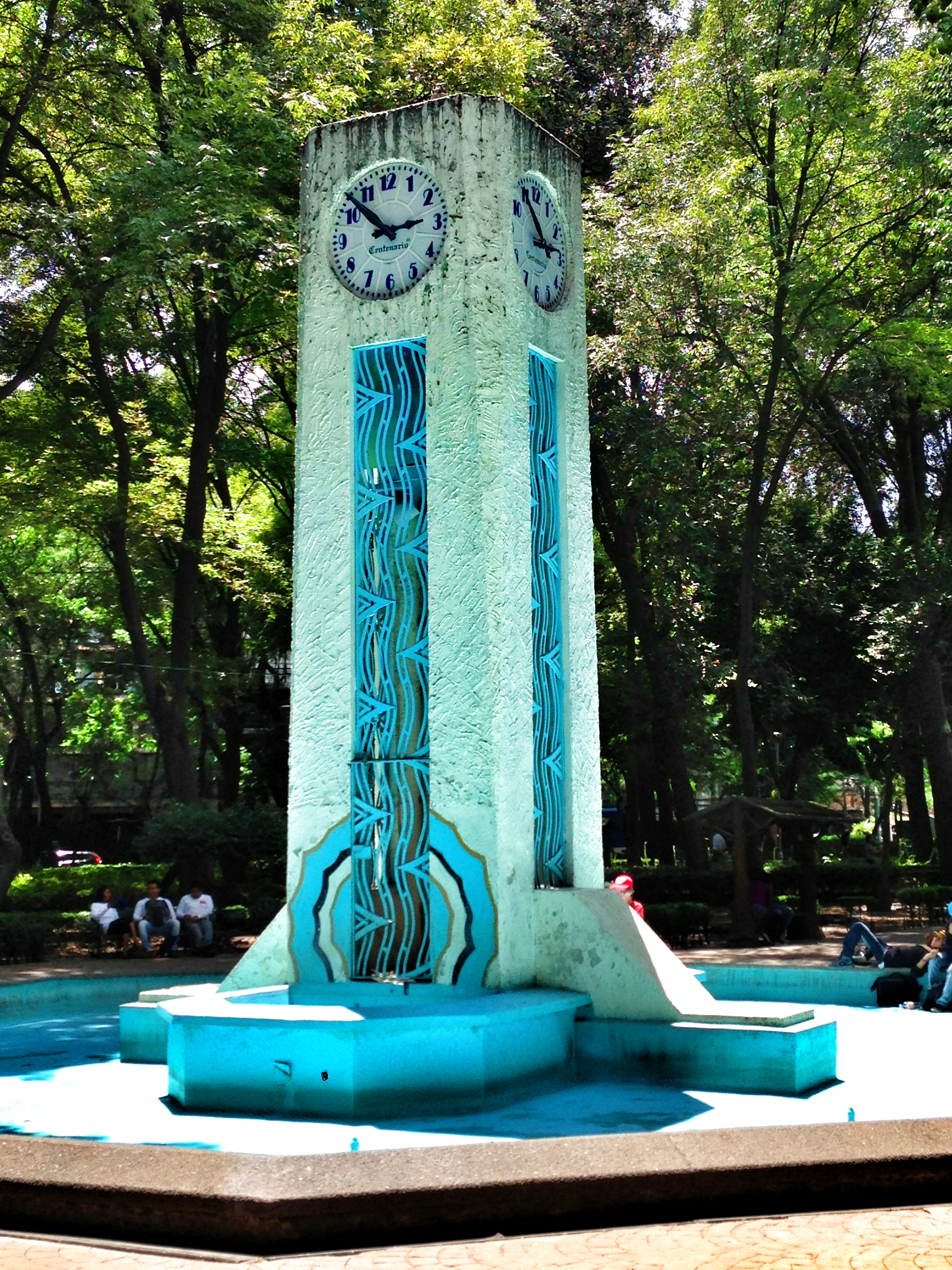
Art deco clock in Parque México

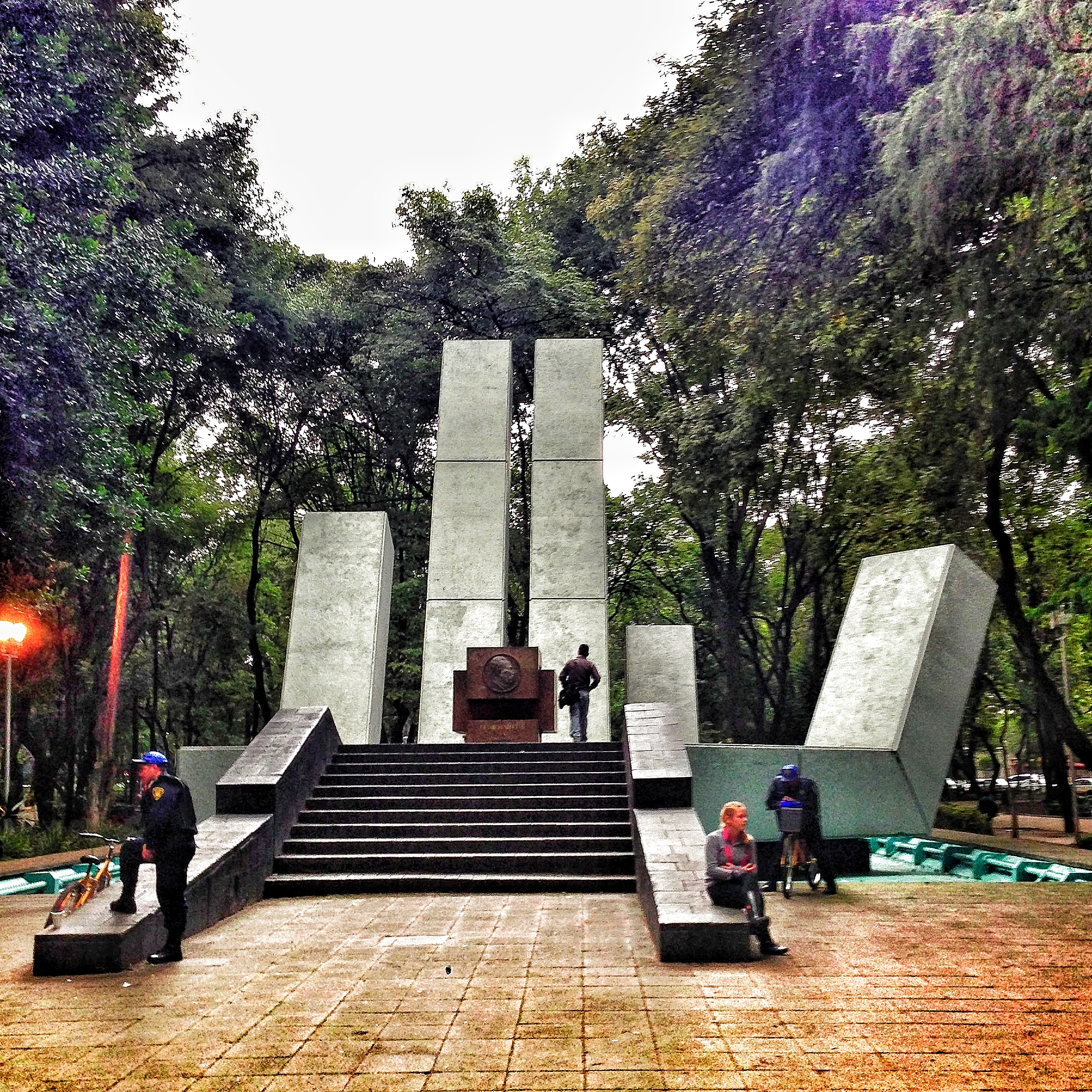
Monument to Lázaro Cárdenas (outstretched hand welcoming Spanish immigrants), Parque España

Condesa or La Condesa is an area in the Cuauhtémoc borough of Mexico City, south of Zona Rosa and 4 to 5 km west of the Zócalo, the city's main square. It is immediately west of Colonia Roma, together with which it is designated as a "Barrio Mágico Turístico" ("Touristic Magic Neighborhood"). Together they are often referred to as Condesa–Roma, one of the most architecturally significant areas of the city and a bastion of the creative communities.

It consists of three colonias or officially recognized neighborhoods: Colonia Condesa, Colonia Hipódromo and Colonia Hipódromo Condesa. The area is considered to be fashionable and popular with younger businesspeople, students and pet lovers. It features a large number of international restaurants, bars and nightclubs.

== Etymology ==
"Condesa" means "countess" and it is named after María Magdalena Dávalos de Bracamontes y Orozco, the Countess of Miravalle, whose lands stretched from what is now Colonia Roma to Tacubaya. The area began as lands belonging to two countesses in the colonial period. By the 19th century and early 20th century, the process of subdividing this land was already begun, although Colonia Condesa proper would not be established until the very early 20th century.

== Location ==
The Condesa as a whole, consisting of the three colonias, is bordered by:

- Av. Veracruz, Av. Álvaro Obregón and Av. Yucatán on the north/northeast, across which is Colonia Roma Norte
- Avenida de los Insurgentes Sur on the east, across which are Col. Roma Norte and Col. Roma Sur
- Eje 4 Sur (Benjamin Franklin) on the south, across which is Colonia Escandón in Miguel Hidalgo borough
- Circuito Interior (José Vasconcelos) on the west/northwest, across which is Colonia San Miguel Chapultepec

The three colonias are located as follows:

- Colonia Hipódromo lies to the east of Av. Tamaulipas and Parque España
- Colonia Condesa lies west of Av. Tamaulipas and north of Av. Michoacán
- Colonia Hipódromo Condesa lies west of Av. Tamaulipas and south of Av. Michoacán

== Description ==
Condesa is considered fashionable, especially among young businesspeople, students, pet lovers and others. There are some wide avenues and lined with trees. It is mostly filled with restaurants, cafés, boutiques and art galleries. Some of these shops include the Rosario Castellanos bookstore, which includes a cáfe, an auditorium theatre and a children's room. Most of the bars and cafes are concentrated along Amsterdam and Michoacán avenues.

While the area has been residential, its "bohemian" character has only been in existence since the late 1980s. While longtime residents complain about noise, crime and other disturbances, the overall reputation of the area continues to grow and attract more restaurants. Most of these residents are young and affluent, with only two of the areas 13 K-8 schools being public.

== Architecture and landmarks ==
Mexico City was affected by the 8.1 magnitude 1985 offshore earthquake; many buildings survived and are now examples of Art Deco architecture, as well as innovative modern designs, which give it an overall urban touch. Many buildings date back to the 1920s, such is the case of the Condesa DF hotel, housed in a 1928 apartment complex; though the art deco style was predominant through to the 1940s. In addition, a lot of new apartment buildings have been built on the sites of former original demolished houses and other infill sites.

The Edificio San Martín by Ernesto Buenrostro and the Edificio México are representative examples of Art Deco architecture in Mexico, which was popular in the 1930s. By the late 1990s, the San Martín was nearly in ruins, but it was restored between 1998 and 2001 by architect Carlos Duclaud. While Duclaud made some changes to the interior, most of the original plan of the building remains intact. One major change was made. In the 1930s, apartment building windows with the best views were in the bedrooms, rather than in the living room and dining room. This was switched to the more modern arrangement, by rearranging interior walls. However, the facades, and most of the public areas such as stairwells, were kept true to the original, with the aim of keeping the building's original "identity".

The Basurto Building is an Art Deco building which is noted for its use of curved and straight lines in its form. It was built on irregularly shaped land which used to be the garden of a man named Basurto. Others built the structure but he authorized the use of his name. The structure was designed by Serrano on Avenida México with a view of Parque México and the Popocatepetl Plaza.

The house "El Barco" on Veracruz 42 was the house of Italian photographer and activist Tina Modotti. She lived there for 3 years from 1924 until 1926.

Overlooking Parque España in the Colonia Roma area is a mansion that belonged to Fernando Torreblanca, personal secretary to Álvaro Obregón, and Hortensia Elias Calles. It was designed by engineer Manuel Luis Stampa. The mansión is now the Fideicomiso Archivos Plutarco Elías Calles y Fernando Torreblanca (FAPECyFT), which houses many documents related to the country's history after the Mexican Revolution.

Michoacán Market is a 1946 building designed in the Functionalist style of Modernist architecture, with market stalls and prepared food stands.

== Parks and green space ==
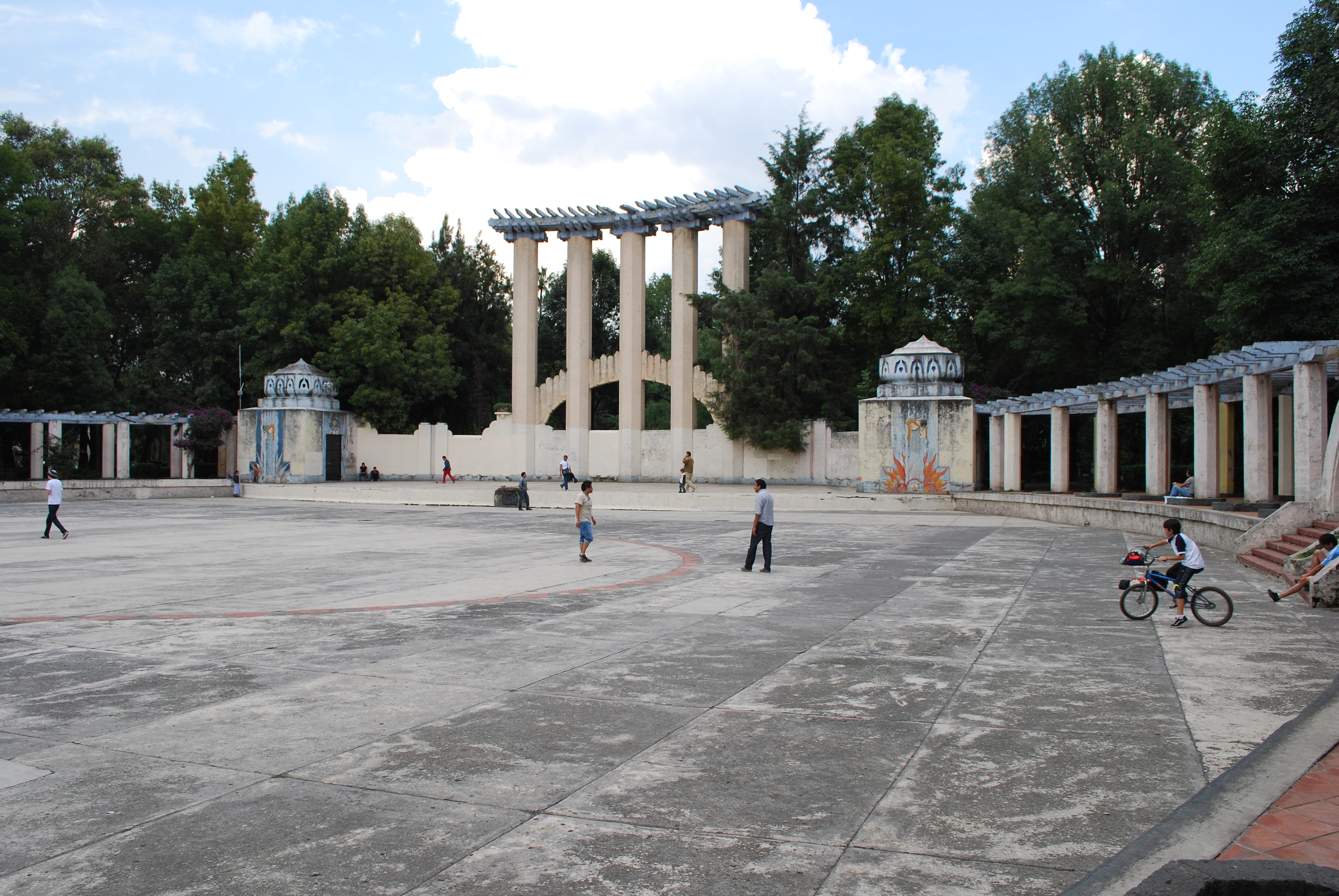
Lindbergh Theater in Parque México

=== Medians ===
The medians of Avenida Ámsterdam, which runs as an oval around Parque México, as well as the medians of avenidas Campeche, Benjamín Hill and Alfonso Reyes, are lined with trees and plants on either side of pedestrian paths that run down the middle.

=== Parque México ===
Parque México was the center of the racetrack that used to occupy Colonia Hipódromo, not only serves as the center of that colonia, it is the defining element of the entire Condesa area. The park is also considered to be the "lungs" of this portion of the city. It was designed as the center of the original, larger Condesa neighborhood during one of its planning phases in the 1920s. The rest of the old hacienda had been parceled into residential units, but due to environmental laws the same could not be done for the old horse track. It was then decided to make that area into a park to serve as a focus for the new neighborhood, as well as to give added green space in a city which lacked it. Today, the park still serves as an attraction to those who settled in the La Condesa area. The park has been recognized by the Instituto Nacional de Antropología e Historia (INAH), as part of the heritage of the entire city.

=== Parque España ===
In the limits of Colonia Roma, smaller, but located very close to Parque México is Parque España, located between Nuevo León, Sonora and Parque España streets. It was established in 1921 to commemorate the 100th anniversary of the end of the Mexican War of Independence. It contains statues such as the monument to Lázaro Cárdenas. In 2008, the park was renovated and remodeled at a cost of over 12 million pesos. In 2009, it was declared as the "Territory of Music and Poetry" (Territorio de Música y Poesía).

=== Parque Morelos ===
Small park in between Alfonso Reyes and Campeche. Right outside a children's school where people tend to set their dogs free. There is a playground for kids as well as a small workout area with machines for adults.

=== Condesa Pocket Park ===
The Condesa pocket park was carved out of a large intersection in 2013.

== Culture ==
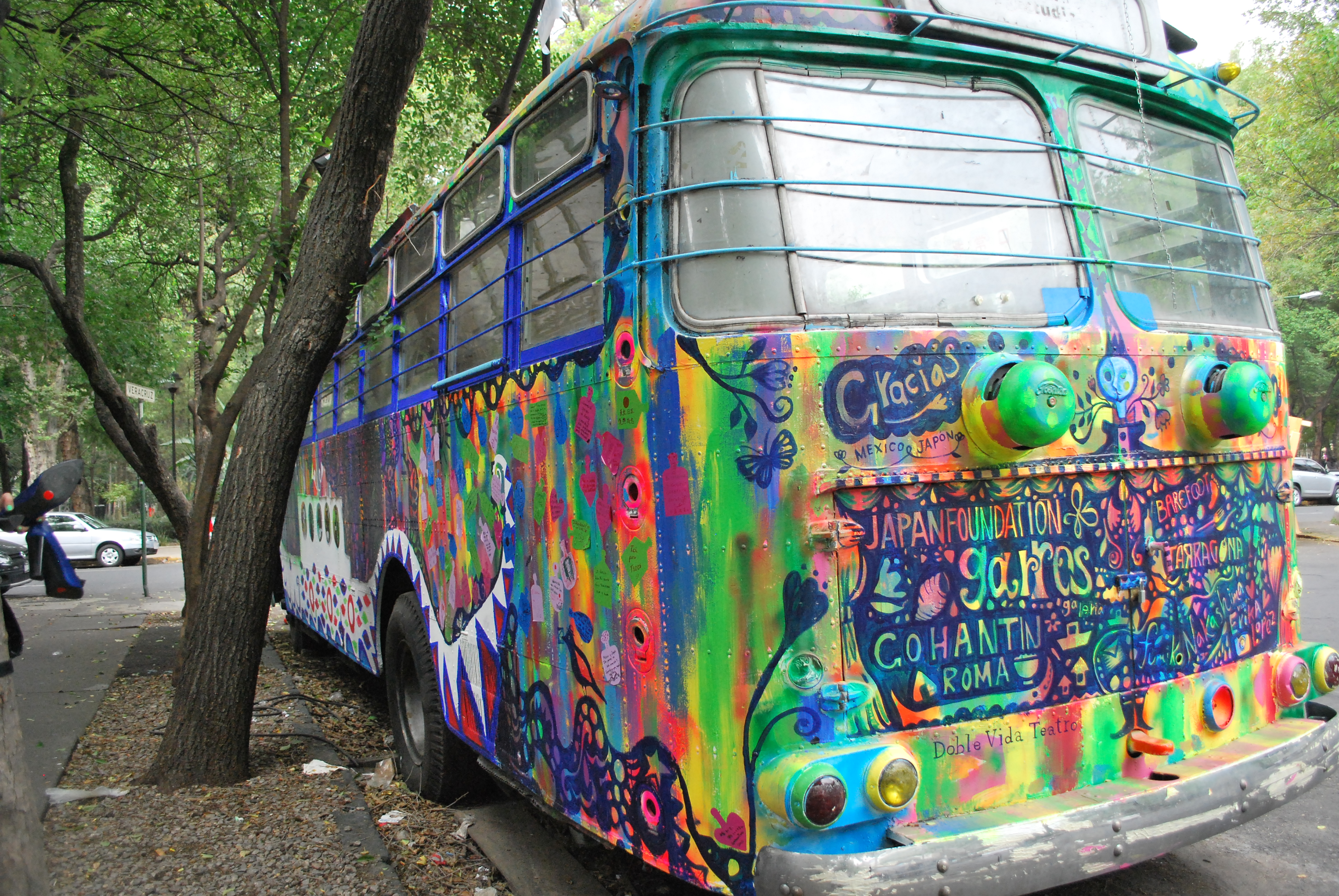
Trolleybus used for live theater productions on Av. Veracruz

The trolleybuses of Roma Condesa are permanently parked trolleybuses donated to Mexico by the Japanese government in 2000, with the idea of creating educational centers, but they sat abandoned until 2005, when the "Galería Trolebús" (Trolleybus Gallery) was begun to promote non-traditional art projects. The gallery ceased operations in 2009 due to financial problems, but the buses are still used for theater and other art projects.

El Plaza Condesa is a concert hall that holds an audience of 1,900. However, it is now closed because the building was damaged during the 2017 earthquake.

The former Cine Las Américas on Insurgentes, a cinema designed by José Villagrán García that opened in 1953, has been a concert venue since 2012, first as the Auditorio Blackberry and now as the Auditorio BB.

A bastion of the creative communities of the city, Condesa is home to many art galleries.

== History ==
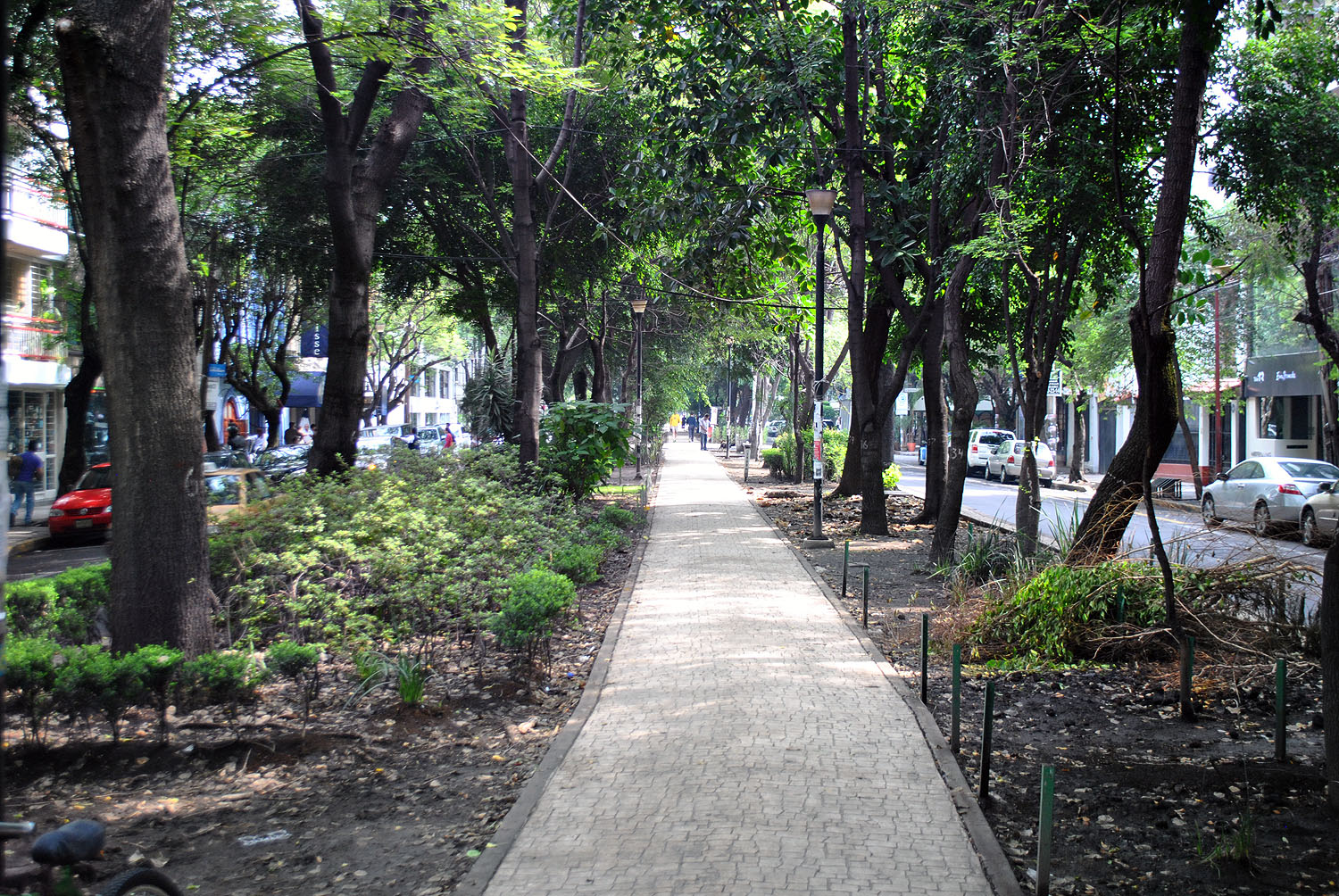
Park island in the middle of Avenida Ámsterdam

=== Origins ===
The first owner of the lands here was Maria de la Campa y Cos, Countess of San Mateo de Valparaíso. She married Miguel de Berrio y Zaldívar Ortíz de Landáuzari, who would later acquire the title of Marquis of Jaral de Berrio. The union produced a daughter, Ana María de Berrio y Campa, who married Pedro de Moncada y de Aragón Branciforte. This union produced both the Marchioness of San Roman and the 3rd Marquis of Jaral de Berrio. This family owned these rather large expanses of land in what is now western Mexico City until the second half of the 19th century. A horse from this estate served as a model for the one which is part of the statue of Carlos V done by Manuel Tolsá. When the last of the direct descendants of the couple died, the land was divided and some of it was acquired by a new owner, María Magdalena Dávalos de Bracamontes y Orozco, the Countess of Miravalle. She converted her property into a hacienda with a manor house which still exists. The neighborhood is named after this countess. The lands of this hacienda extended over what is now Colonia Roma, Colonia Condesa, Colonia Hipódromo and part of Tacubaya. At the end of the 19th century, the property passed into the hands of Dolores Escandón y Arango. The hacienda manor was rented and today it serves as the Russian Embassy.

The colonia was officially established in 1902, although it had been in existence for some time before that, being home to a number of upper-class urban supporters of President Porfirio Díaz’s regime. From the beginning it has had one of the best planned infrastructures, with large parks and large tree-lined avenues. Around this time, a private race track was initially operated by the Sociedad del Jockey Club Mexicano, which used it automobile racing as well as horse racing, and it was inaugurated by Diaz himself in 1910. A second was planned but never built. When the Mexican Revolution broke out, many in the neighborhood were under siege by the lower classes and the horse track eventually closed. Today, the curve of this track can still be seen in the layout of Avenida Amsterdam.

Around the same time a bullring was also built, financed by notable people such as Lucas Alamán and called El Toreo. It was built with materials brought from Belgium and located on what are now Durango Street, Avenida Oaxaca, Salamanca, Valladolid and Colima Street with a capacity of 23,000 spectators. Much of this site now is occupied by a Palacio de Hierro department store.

From the early 20th century, the land was further divided but sold into residential units, with water, roads and other infrastructure introduced as early as the first decade of the 20th century. Eventually all of the former hacienda was developed into residential areas by the 1920s. Initially, Colonia Condesa included areas now known as Colonia Roma Sur, Colonia Hipódromo and Colonia Hipódromo Condesa, but these were defined as separate colonias later as population increased.

=== Growth ===
For the first two thirds of the 20th century, the colonia grew, becoming popular with middle and upper classes as well as a number of foreigners. Many of these earlier residents had an artistic bent, such as Agustín Lara, a composer of romantic ballads, flamenco dancer Pilar Rioja and painter Juan Soriano. Cantínflas, a famous Mexican film comedian had offices here. In the 1920s, large wave of Jewish immigrants into Mexico, mostly Ashkenazis from Eastern Europe settled in the city, many in this colonia. They opened synagogues, community centers, kosher shops and bakeries. There were also a significant number of Spanish refugees from the Spanish Civil War. German immigrants settled in the neighbourhood as well, where the German school Colegio Alemán Alexander von Humboldt had its main campus from 1940 until the 1980s. All of this would give the neighborhood an urbane and cosmopolitan reputation.

In the first half of the 20th century, it was tradition here to go every Sunday to La Coronación church on the corner of Antonio Solá and Parque España to hear mass. After, one then walked along Fernando Montes de Oca Street to Cuautla Street to eat at "El Tío Luis," the oldest and most traditional of the area's restaurants. It is said that it was the meeting place of bullfighters, businessmen, cattlemen and bullfighting fans from the nearby Plaza de Toros Condesa. Other traditional establishments were the Roxy ice cream place and the La Gran Vía and La Panadería bakeries. The Bella Época movie theater used to be called the Lido. There used to be a pulquería named La Carioca. There was prostitution in the old days as well with some of these women well known around the neighborhood by their working names such as La Chimuela, La Tejocota, La Lupona and La Caperuza. Many of the older residents remember the area as a "paradise" without pollution, traffic congestion or crime.

By the 1970s, younger Mexican-born generations of these immigrants began to leave Condesa for other, more fashionable neighborhoods such as Polanco, or the mid-century neighborhoods Colonia del Valle and Colonia Nápoles. However, the 1985 Mexico City earthquake had a devastating impact on Condesa and Roma. It was damaged physically, and its proximity to heavily damaged Colonia Roma accelerated the already ongoing process of abandonment in the 1980s. Rents in the area fell and many buildings were abandoned and even the two major parks in the area, Parque México and Parque España became dangerous. The only families that remained were those who founded the colonia and those without the money to leave.

=== Gentrification ===
The low rents and wide spaces attracted a new generation of young people to the area who came to live. Others came and installed offices, whose employees need places to eat and parking facilities. This initially created a large demand for restaurants as originally, the number and quality of restaurants was limited. Many of these specialized in "mittle" or European food. New restaurants appeared and competed for business and their overall reputation for quality grew. The young people and restaurants then attracted bars and nightclubs to the area. Most of the restaurants today are located from Avenida Mazatlán to Insurgentes and on Alfonso Reyes to Juan Escutia and are estimated at 120. The newer restaurants introduced a new element to dining in Condesa, tables set out on the sidewalk, a rarity as late as the 1990s. However, given Mexico City's mild climate, the concept was an instant success. These restaurant also tend to be more informal and cater to younger crowds with more noise and music than traditional venues and decorated with local artwork.

The influx of new people and business also brought in some negative elements such as parking problems, trash, transients, noise, crime and overload of the areas drainage and other infrastructure. It also created a demand for street food stalls, which never existed in the area before and bother old-time residents. Over the years, many of the buildings' uses were changed without regulation which put strains on the drainage, electrical system and water in some places.

Older residents complain of the noise, street congestion, drugs and prostitution. A recent drive to allow bars to stay open later was rejected by residents, and there are demands to review the licenses of establishments which generate noise and around which crimes have happened. Another complaint associated with these bars is the invasion of customers' cars into private parking spaces. Some residents claim that visibly armed guards and patrons can now be seen in the area day or night.

=== Condesa today ===
Anonymous flyers were distributed in the colonia threatening to exterminate stray dogs in the neighborhood. One of the reasons given for this threat was the amount of feces found on neighborhood streets.

The area was affected by the 2017 Mexico City earthquake with two major collapsed buildings where rescue efforts continued day and night for several days, at Álvaro Obregón 286 and at the corner of Amsterdam and Laredo, while other buildings in danger of collapse were evacuated.

== Demographics ==
=== Jewish community in Roma and Condesa ===
In the 1930s and 40s many Jewish residents moved from downtown Mexico City to Condesa, where Yiddish was the unofficial language of Parque México, the local park. Today, in the area, there is a Jewish museum, archives, synagogue, several more small orthodox synagogues hidden inside houses on Amsterdam Avenue, and another synagogue at the corner of Montes de Oca and Parral streets. In the 1950s, 60s, and 70s, Jews moved further west to Polanco, Lomas de Chapultepec, Interlomas, Bosques de las Lomas, and Tecamachalco, where the majority are now based.

== Transportation ==
The area is served by the Mexico City Metro at its edges, and inside the area by the Metrobus, city buses, privately operated peseros (minibuses) and mid-sized buses, and trolleybuses. The city-wide EcoBici bicycle-sharing system is available.

Metro stations

- Patriotismo metro station
- Chilpancingo metro station
- Chapultepec metro station
- Juanacatlan metro station

Metrobus stations

- Sonora
- Campeche
- Chilpancingo
- Nuevo León

== Education ==
Colegio Alemán Alexander von Humboldt previously had a campus at 43 Benjamin G. Hill in Hipódromo Condesa, in what is now a part of Universidad La Salle.
