= Ernesto Buenrostro =

Mexican architect and painter (1899–1966)

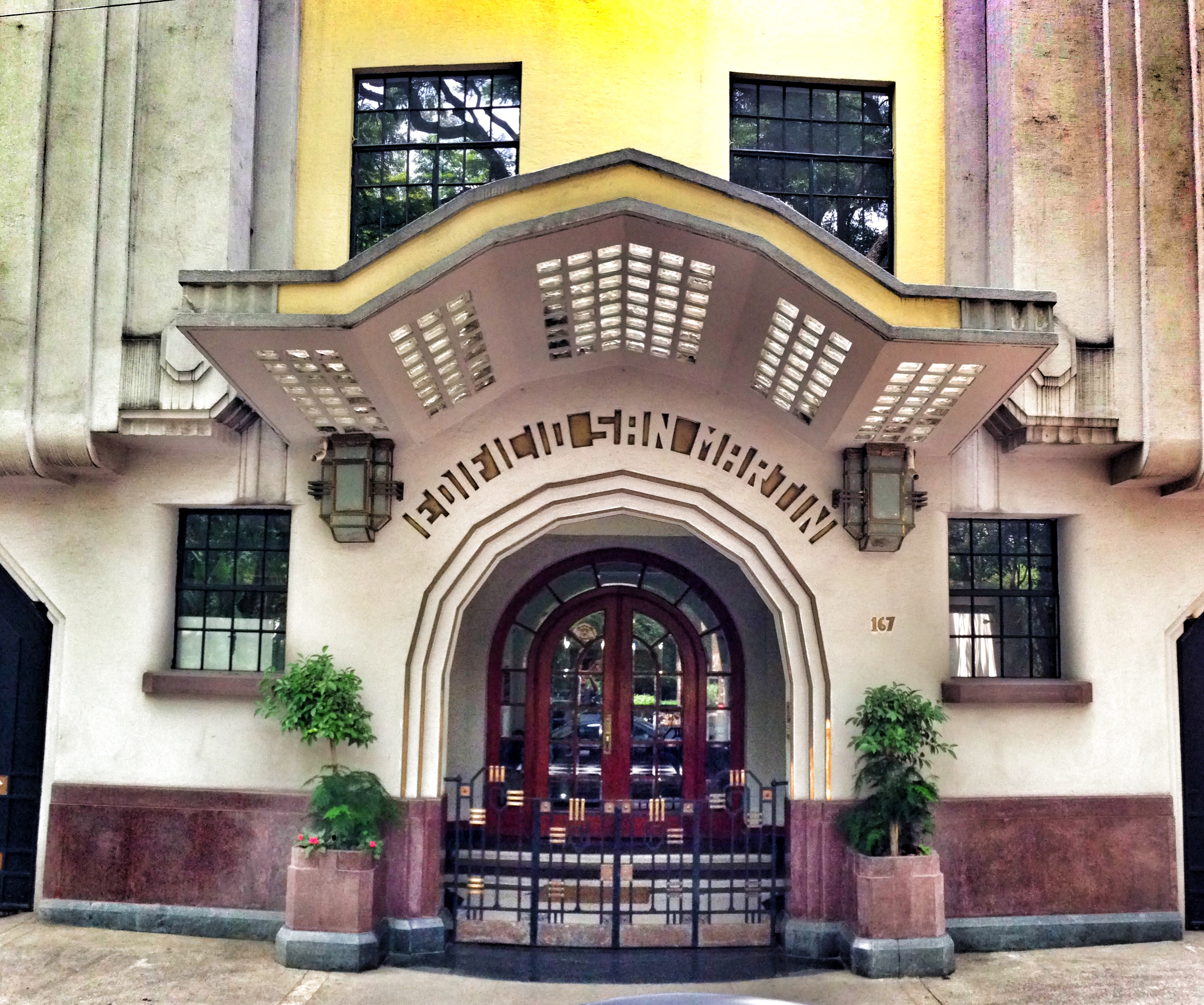
Edificio San Martín on Avenida México in the Condesa area of Mexico City, famous for its art deco architecture.

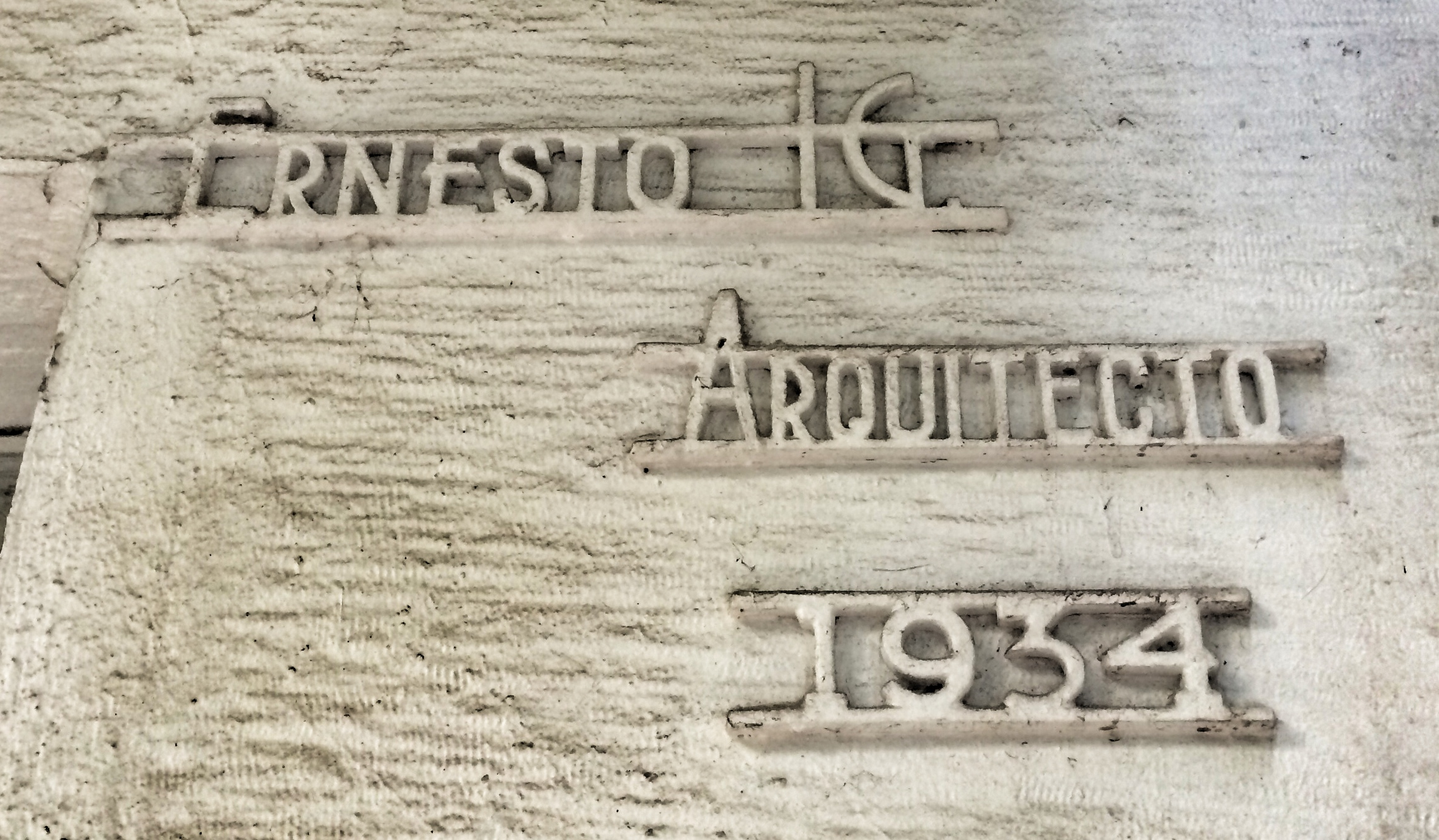
Nameplate (missing last name) on Roxy Building, Avenida Mexico 33, Hipodromo, Condesa

Ernesto Angel Ignacio Buenrostro y Buenrostro (31 July 1899 – 28 February 1966) was an architect of various Art Deco style residential buildings in the Hipódromo neighborhood of the Condesa area of Mexico City.

His works include:

- Edificio San Martín (Avenida México 167; built 1931; renovated 1998-9)
- Edificio Lux (Plaza Popocatépetl 36, built 1931)
- Edificio Roxy (Avenida México 33; built 1934)
- Edificio de el Parque (Avenida México 169, built 1935)

In addition:

- Edificio Piccadilly, 1930, Insurgentes 309;
- Edificio Michoacán, 1930, Michoacán 54;
- Edificio Tehuacán, 1931;
- Edificio Berta, 1931, Avenida México 184

Ernesto Buenrostro worked together with other members of the Buenrostro family, such as Ing. Agustín Buenrostro, Arq. José Ignacio Buenrostro and Ing. José Manuel Buenrostro.
