= Amsterdam Avenue (Mexico City) =

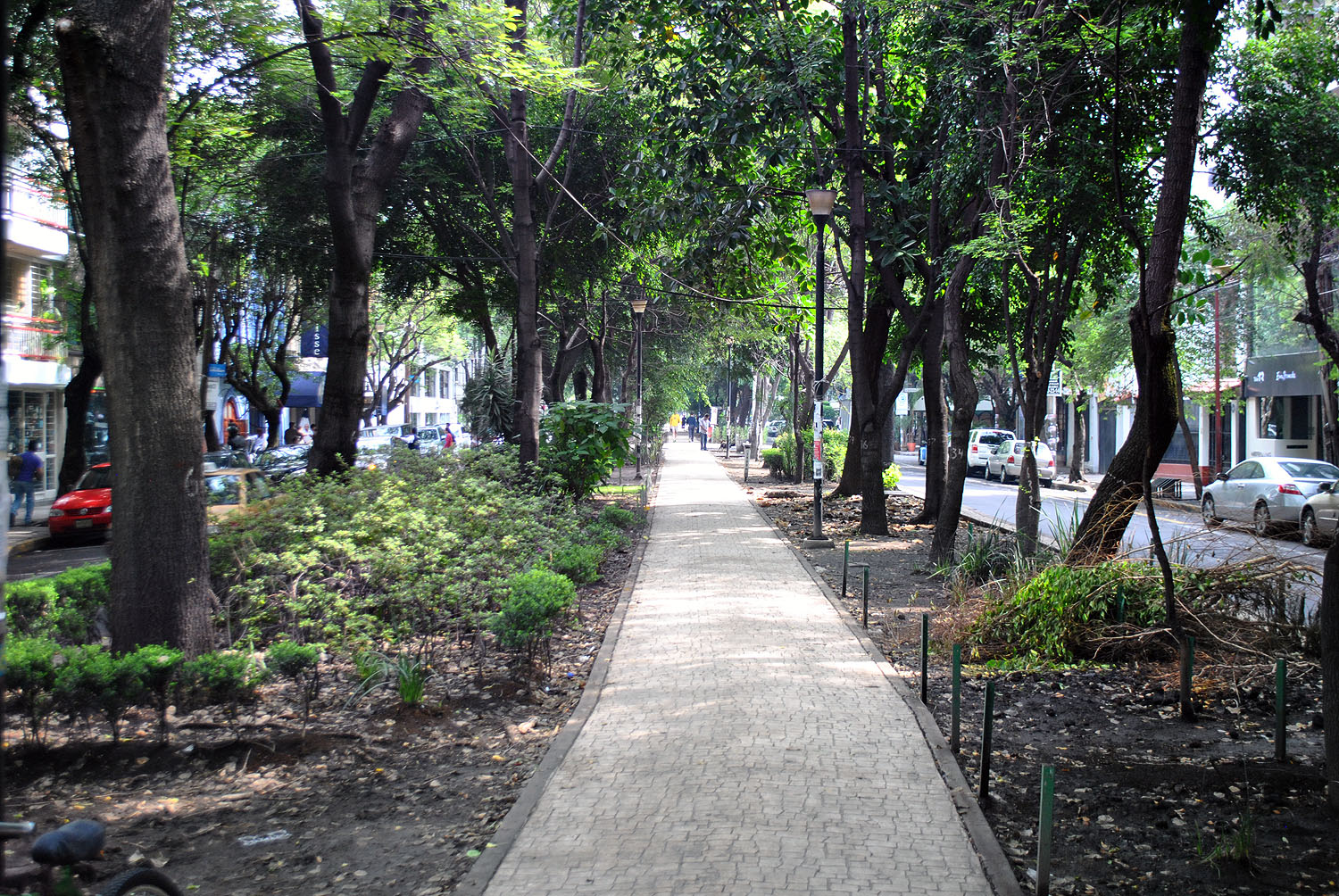
Green median of Avenida Ámsterdam

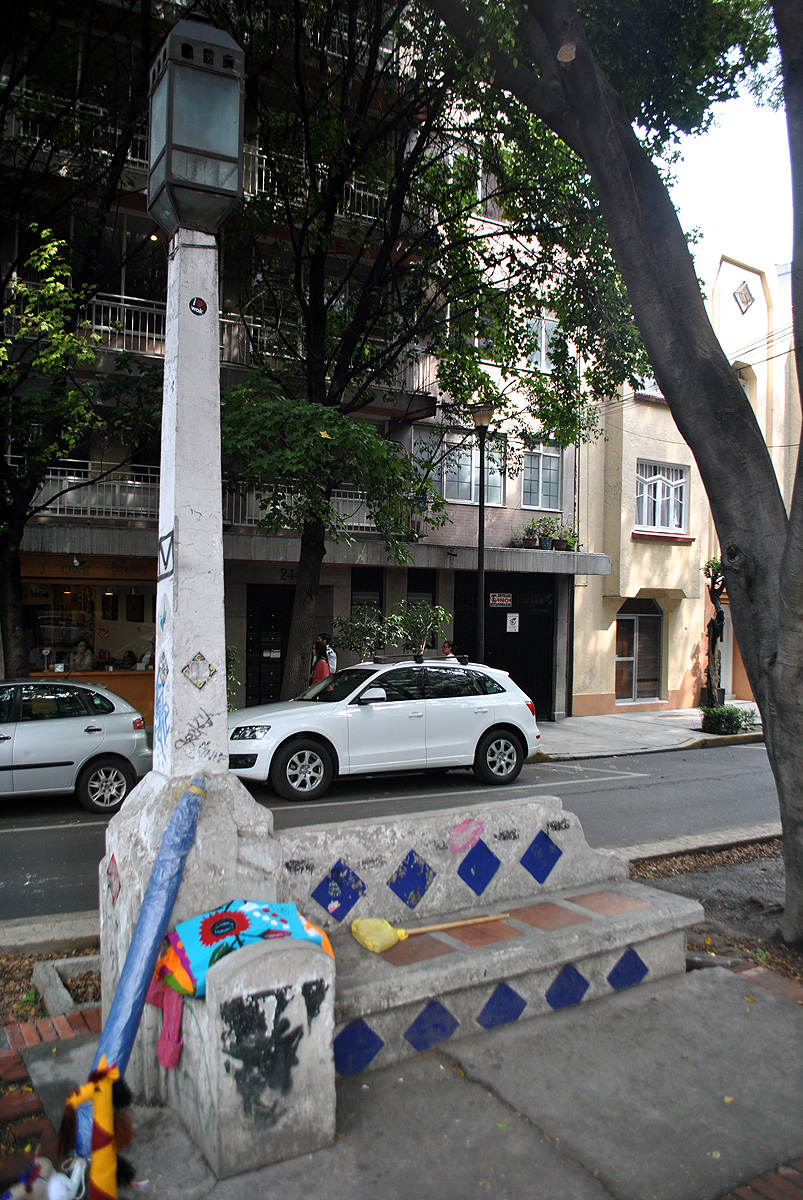
Benches along the avenue's median

Avenida Ámsterdam (Amsterdam Avenue) is located in Colonia Hipódromo (Racetrack Colony) in the area known as "la Condesa" (the countess) in Cuauhtemoc, Mexico City. The avenue is elliptical and edges Parque Mexico, including a central pedestrian area and roundabouts named for the main peaks of Mexico: Popocatepetl, Iztaccihuatl and Citlaltépetl.

The avenue features Art Deco buildings and modest homes. The name is from a horse track that belonged to the Countess of Miravalle and it roughly resembles the track's shape. The street is adorned with Art Deco benches and several notable buildings including by architect Francisco J. Serrano (285 Amsterdam) and residents such as:

- Pascual Ortiz Rubio, former president of Mexico
- Paulina Lavista, photographer
- Salvador Elizondo, writer

== Sources ==
Flores García, Marisol (2001). Tourist guide to Urban Colonia Hipódromo CONACULTA / Universidad Iberoamericana.
