= Condesa pocket park =

Park in Mexico City

Coordinates: 19°24′41.1″N 99°10′29.5″W

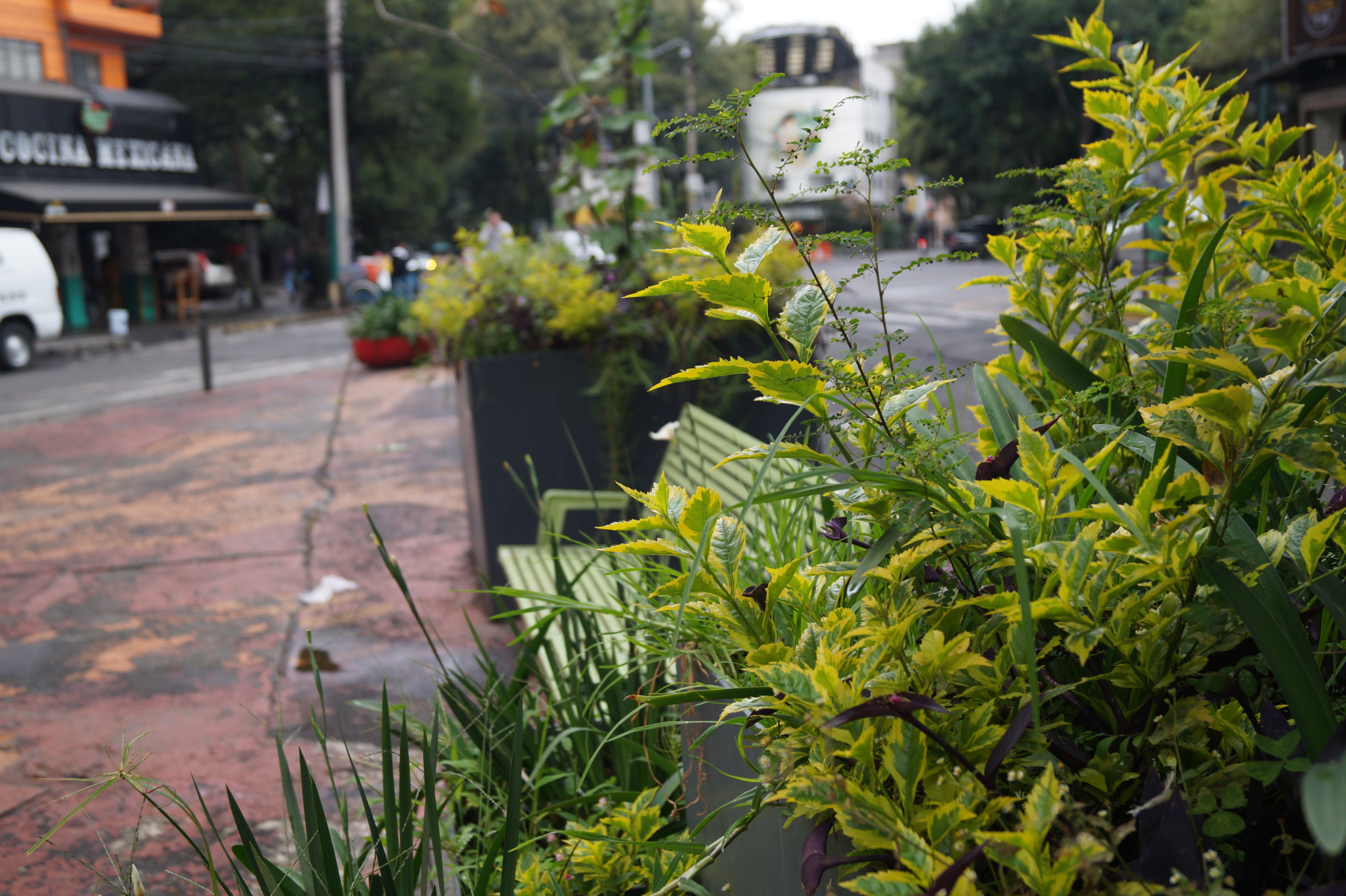
- Condesa pocket park
- Interactive map of Condesa pocket park
- Location: Condesa, Mexico City
- Area: 231 square metres (2,490 ft^{2})
- Created: June 2013

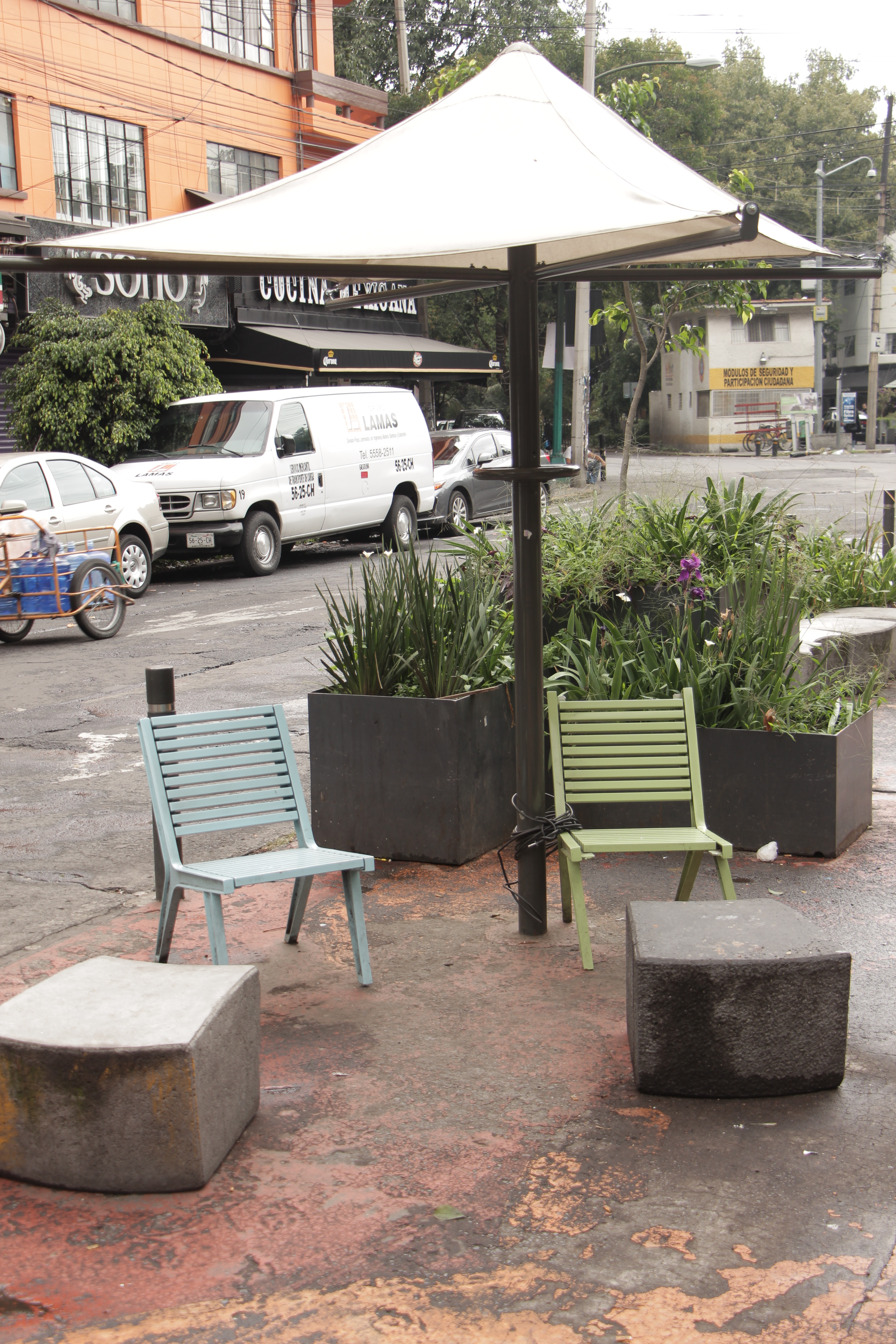
Condesa pocket park

The Condesa pocket park, (Spanish: Parque de bolsillo de la Condesa), is a pocket park in the Condesa neighborhood of the Cuauhtémoc borough in Mexico City.

The park opened in June 2013 and was created on land that was formerly part of the intersection of Avenida Michoacán and Avenida Vicente Suárez streets.

The park is 231 square metres (2,490 ft^{2}) in size. Its design features include: 8 Magnolia trees, 3 bicycle racks, 10 park benches, and 16 raised planters.

The cost was about $650,000 Mexican pesos, or US$50,000 in 2013.
