= Plaza Popocatépetl =

Plaza in Mexico City, Mexico

Coordinates: 19°24′53.5″N 99°10′4.5″W

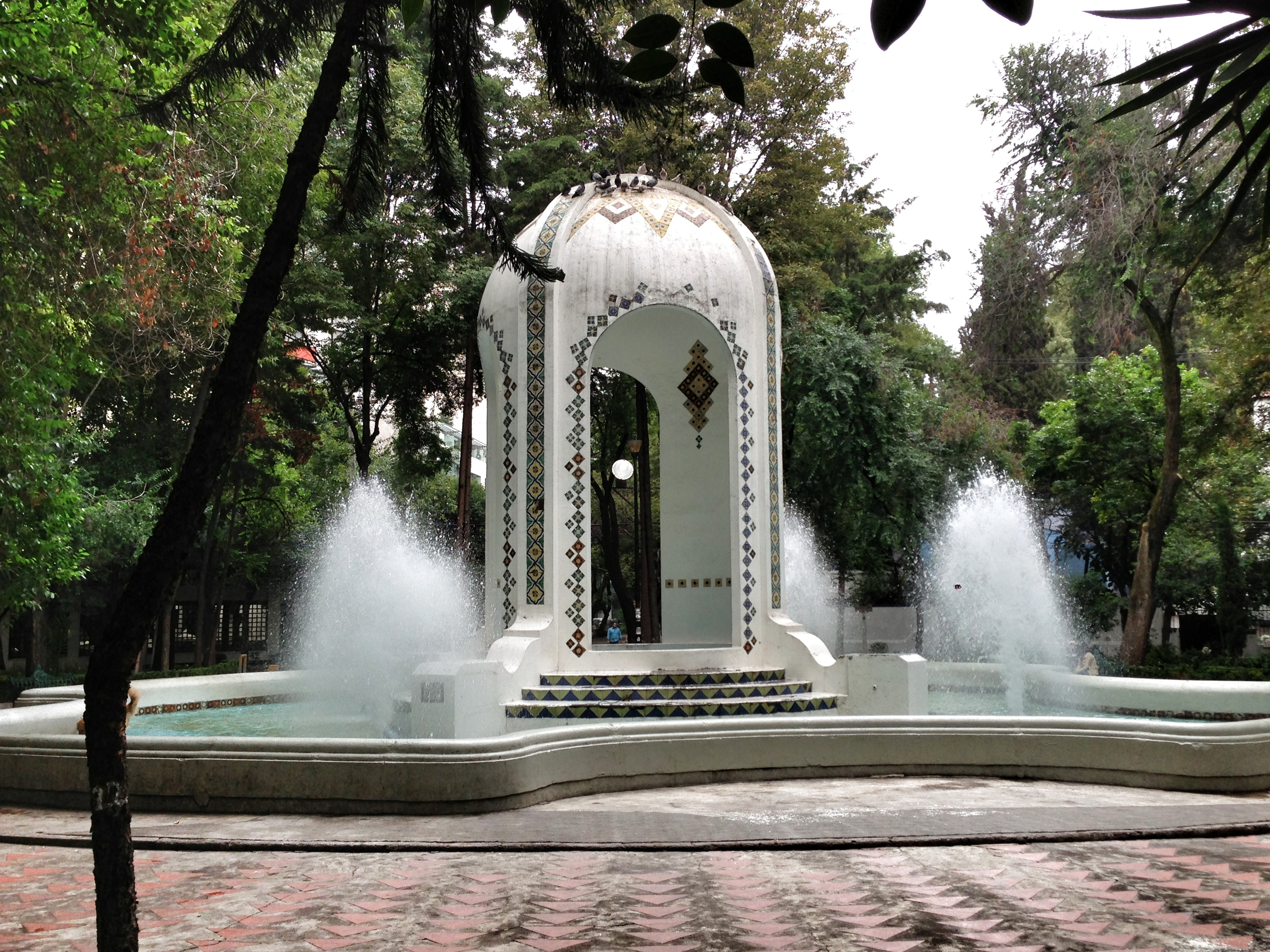
- Location: Mexico
- Type: Art Deco

Plaza Popocatépetl is a plaza in Condesa, Mexico City, Mexico. The center of the plaza features an Art Deco fountain completed c. 1927.
