= Bust of Albert Einstein =

Sculpture in Mexico City, Mexico

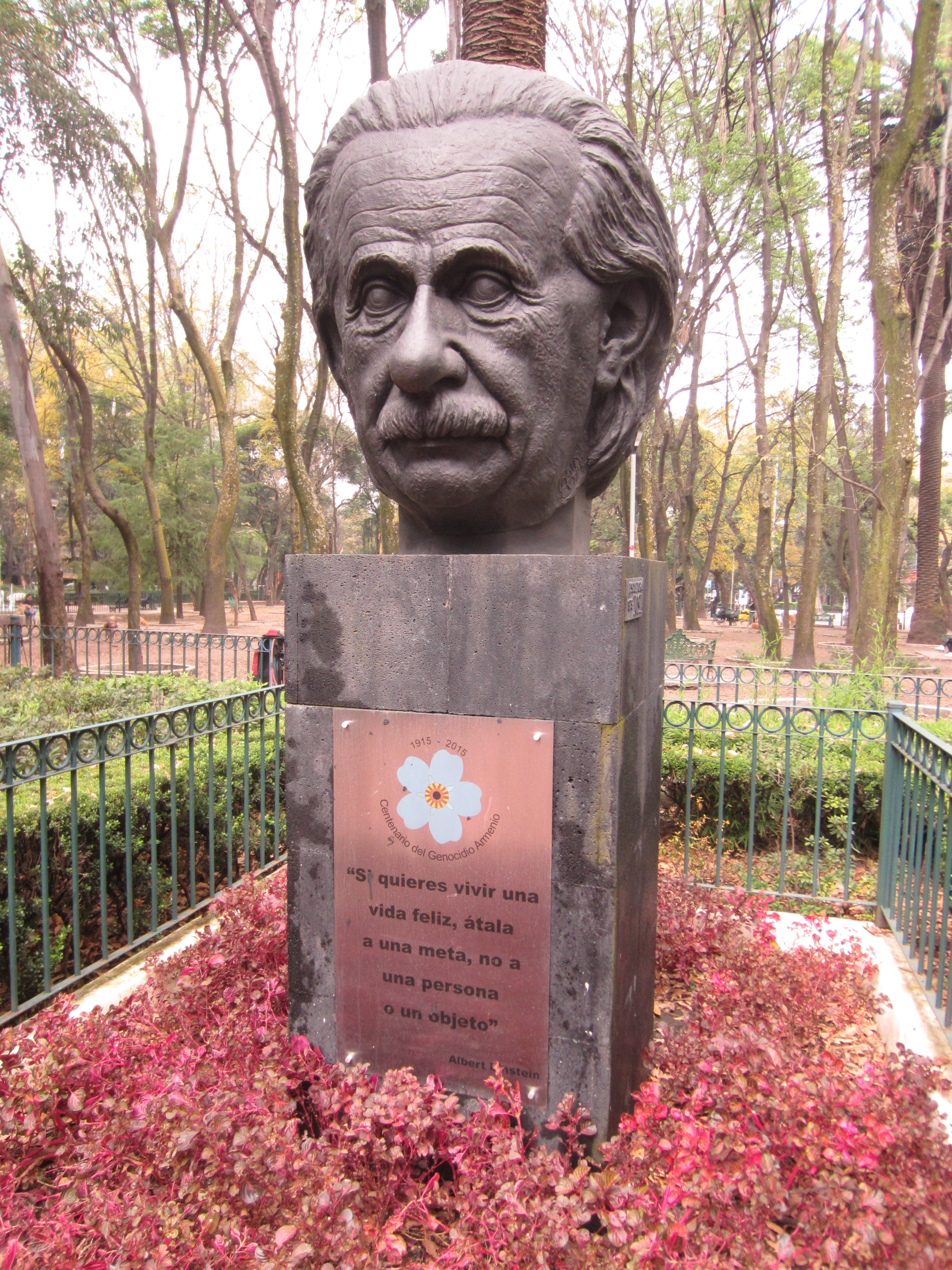
- The bust in 2018
- Artist: Tosia Malamud
- Medium: Bronze
- Subject: Albert Einstein
- Location: Mexico City, Mexico; 19°24′38.7″N 99°10′10.2″W

The bronze bust of Albert Einstein is installed in Mexico City's Parque México, in Mexico. The head was sculpted by Tosia Malamud, a Mexican artist whose family emigrated from Ukraine in 1927. The sculpture commemorates the 100th anniversary of the Armenian genocide. The statue seems to have been donated by Mexico City's Jewish community.

The commemorative plaque on the front of the statue, which dates to the centennial of the Armenian genocide in 2015, reads: "If you want to live a happy life, tie it to a goal, not to a person or an object." The purple flower, a Forget-Me-Not, on the plaque was the logo of the centenary.

Other casts of Malamud's sculpted head of Einstein appear around in the world, such as at Tel Aviv University.

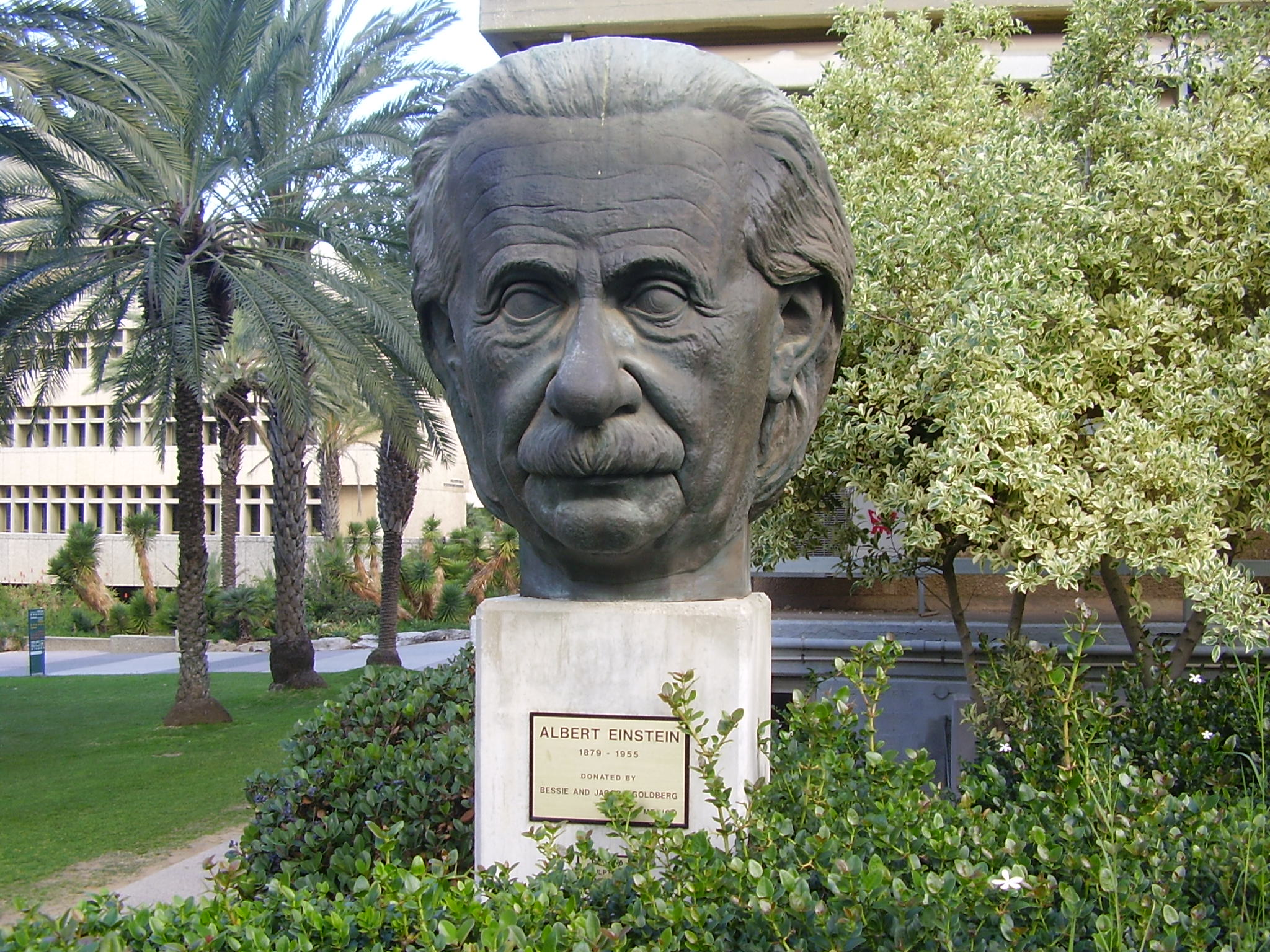
Malamud's statue of Einstein at Tel Aviv University

== See also ==
- Albert Einstein in popular culture
- Einstein's awards and honors
