= List of awards and honors received by Albert Einstein =

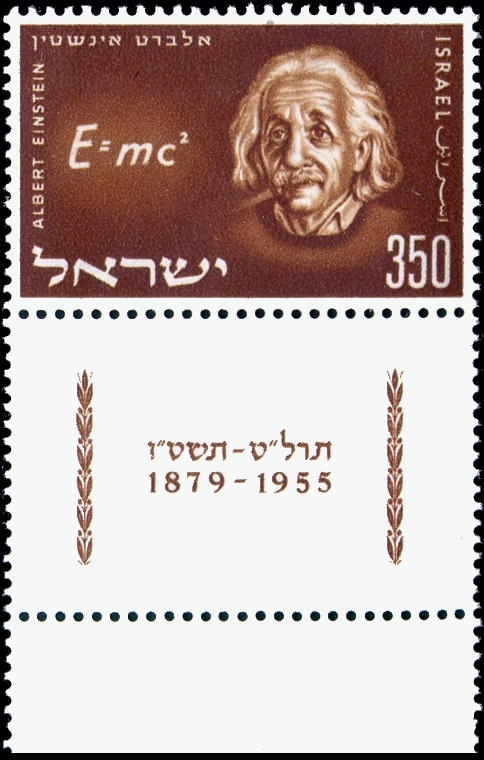
Israeli postage stamp (1956)

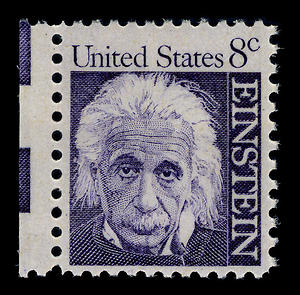
U.S. postage stamp (1966)

In 1922 Albert Einstein was awarded the 1921 Nobel Prize in Physics, "for his services to Theoretical Physics, and especially for his discovery of the law of the photoelectric effect". This refers to his 1905 paper on the photoelectric effect, "On a Heuristic Viewpoint Concerning the Production and Transformation of Light", which was well supported by the experimental evidence by that time. The presentation speech began by mentioning "his theory of relativity [which had] been the subject of lively debate in philosophical circles [and] also has astrophysical implications which are being rigorously examined at the present time".

== Awards ==
It was long reported that in accord with the divorce settlement, the Nobel Prize money had been deposited in a Swiss bank account for his wife Mileva Marić to invest for herself and their two sons, while she could only use the capital by agreement with Einstein. However, personal correspondence made public in 2006 shows that he invested much of it in the United States, and saw much of it wiped out in the Great Depression. Ultimately, however, he paid Marić more money than he received with the prize.

On November 12, 1913, Einstein was granted full membership in the Prussian Academy of Sciences. On March 28, 1933, he resigned membership, explaining in a letter to the academy that he did not want to be associated with the Prussian government of the time.

On November 12, 1919, the University of Rostock awarded an honorary doctorate of medicine (Dr. med. h.c.) to Einstein, on the occasion of its 500th anniversary and following a suggestion by Moritz Schlick. This is the only honorary doctorate he received from a German university.

In 1921, Einstein accepted a Doctor of Science degree from the University of Manchester. In addition to receiving the degree, Einstein gave a lecture in Manchester on June 9.

In 1925 the Royal Society awarded Einstein the Copley Medal.

In 1926, he was awarded the Gold Medal of the Royal Astronomical Society.

In 1929, Max Planck presented Einstein with the Max Planck medal of the German Physical Society in Berlin, for extraordinary achievements in theoretical physics.

In 1931, he received the Prix Jules Janssen, In 1934 Einstein gave the Josiah Willard Gibbs lecture.

In 1936, Einstein was awarded the Franklin Institute's Franklin Medal for his extensive work on relativity and the photo-electric effect.

The International Union of Pure and Applied Physics named 2005 the "World Year of Physics" in commemoration of the 100th anniversary of the publication of the annus mirabilis papers.

The chemical element 99, einsteinium, was named for him in August 1955, four months after Einstein's death. 2001 Einstein is an inner main belt asteroid discovered on 5 March 1973.

In 1999 Time magazine named him the Person of the Century, ahead of Mahatma Gandhi and Franklin Roosevelt, among others. In the words of a biographer, "to the scientifically literate and the public at large, Einstein is synonymous with genius". Also in 1999, an opinion poll of 100 leading physicists ranked Einstein the "greatest physicist ever". A Gallup poll recorded him as the fourth most admired person of the 20th century in the U.S.

In 1990, his name was added to the Walhalla temple for "laudable and distinguished Germans", which is located in Donaustauf in Bavaria.

The United States Postal Service honored Einstein with a Prominent Americans series (1965–1978) 8¢ postage stamp.

In 2008, Einstein was inducted into the New Jersey Hall of Fame.

In 2018, Einstein was an inaugural inductee into the Royal Albert Hall's Walk of Fame. In October 1933 he made a speech before a packed out British audience in the Hall on his fear of the looming crisis in Europe, and in recognition of this his name was among those viewed as "key players" in the building's history.

The bust of Albert Einstein, installed in Mexico City's Parque México, commemorates the 100th anniversary of the Armenian genocide.

Mount Einstein, a massive mountain in Alaska, was named in his honor in 1955.

== Things named after Einstein ==
The Albert Einstein Award (sometimes called the Albert Einstein Medal because it is accompanied with a gold medal) is an award in theoretical physics, established to recognize high achievement in the natural sciences. It was endowed by the Lewis and Rosa Strauss Memorial Fund in honor of Albert Einstein's 70th birthday. It was first awarded in 1951 and included a prize money of $15,000, which was later reduced to $5,000. The winner is selected by a committee (the first of which consisted of Einstein, Oppenheimer, von Neumann and Weyl) of the Institute for Advanced Study, which administers the award. The Albert Einstein Medal is an award presented by the Albert Einstein Society in Bern, Switzerland. First given in 1979, the award is presented to people who have "rendered outstanding services" in connection with Einstein. The Albert Einstein Peace Prize is given yearly by the Chicago, Illinois-based Albert Einstein Peace Prize Foundation. Winners of the prize receive $50,000.

The Albert Einstein College of Medicine is a research-intensive medical school located in the Morris Park neighborhood of the Bronx in New York City. The Albert Einstein Science Park is located on the hill Telegrafenberg in Potsdam, Germany. The best known building in the park is the Einstein Tower which has a bronze bust of Einstein at the entrance. The Tower is an astrophysical observatory that was built to perform checks of Einstein's theory of General Relativity. The Albert Einstein Memorial in central Washington, D.C. is a monumental bronze statue depicting Einstein seated with manuscript papers in hand. The statue, commissioned in 1979, is located in a grove of trees at the southwest corner of the grounds of the National Academy of Sciences on Constitution Avenue.
