= March for Justice =

March for Justice or March of Justice may refer to:

- March of Justice, a November 2013 march during the 2013–2014 Bulgarian protests
- 2015 Armenian March for Justice, a march in Los Angeles, California, to demand recognition of the Armenian Genocide
- 2017 March for Justice, a march from Ankara to Istanbul to protest against arrests following the July 2016 coup d'état attempt
- Ministers March for Justice, a 2017 demonstration of religious leaders organized by Al Sharpton
- 2021 March 4 Justice, a national series of protests in Australia in protest of sexism, misogyny
- 2023 Wagner Group rebellion. Described by Wagner chief Yevgeny Prigozhin as a "march of justice".
