= Fuente de los Cántaros =

Ornamental fountain in Mexico City, Mexico

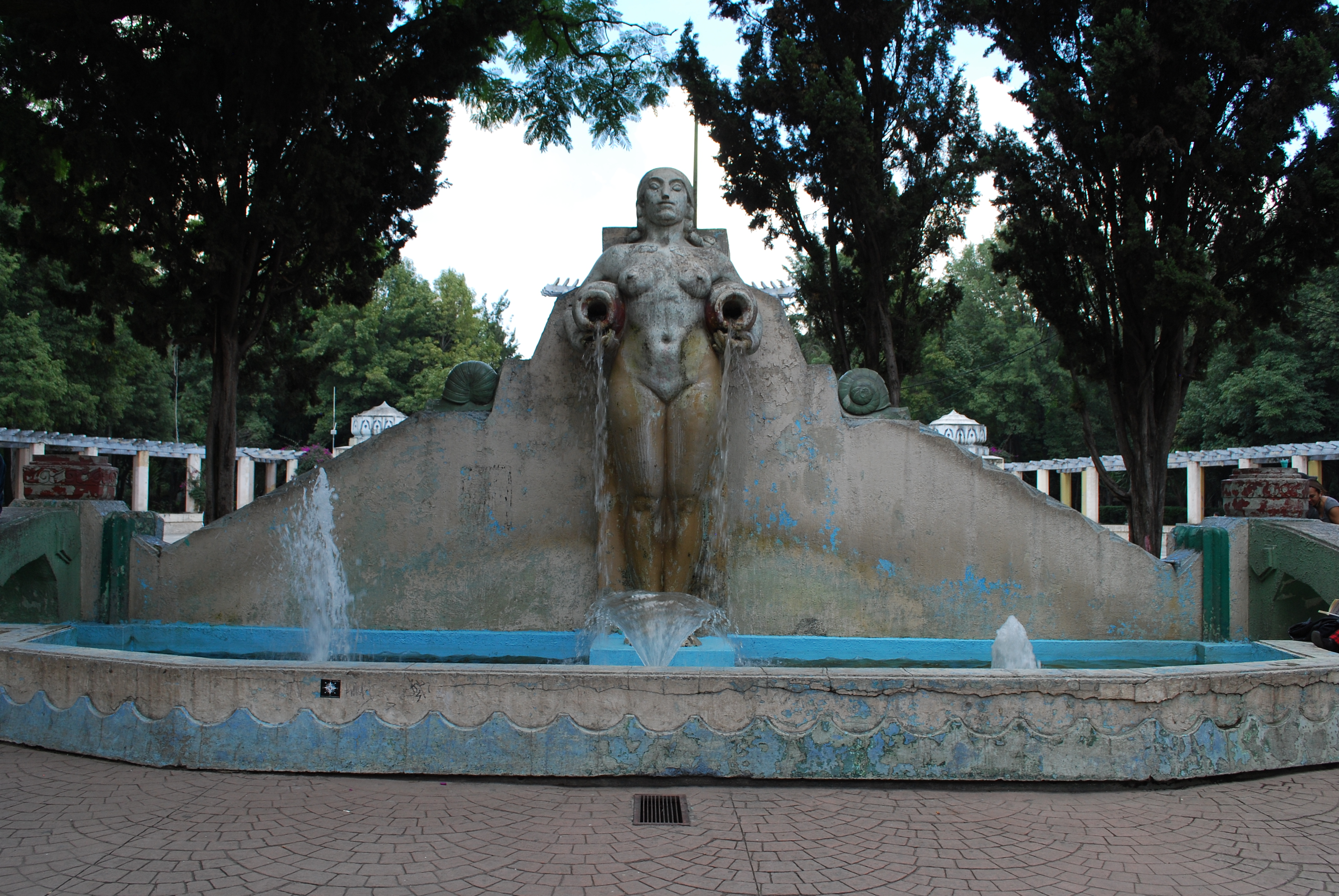
- The fountain and sculpture, 2010
- Artist: José María Hernández Urbina
- Year: c. 1927
- Medium: concrete
- Dimensions: 300 cm (120 in)
- Condition: Restored
- Location: Parque México, Mexico City, Mexico; 19°24′41.3″N 99°10′10.77″W

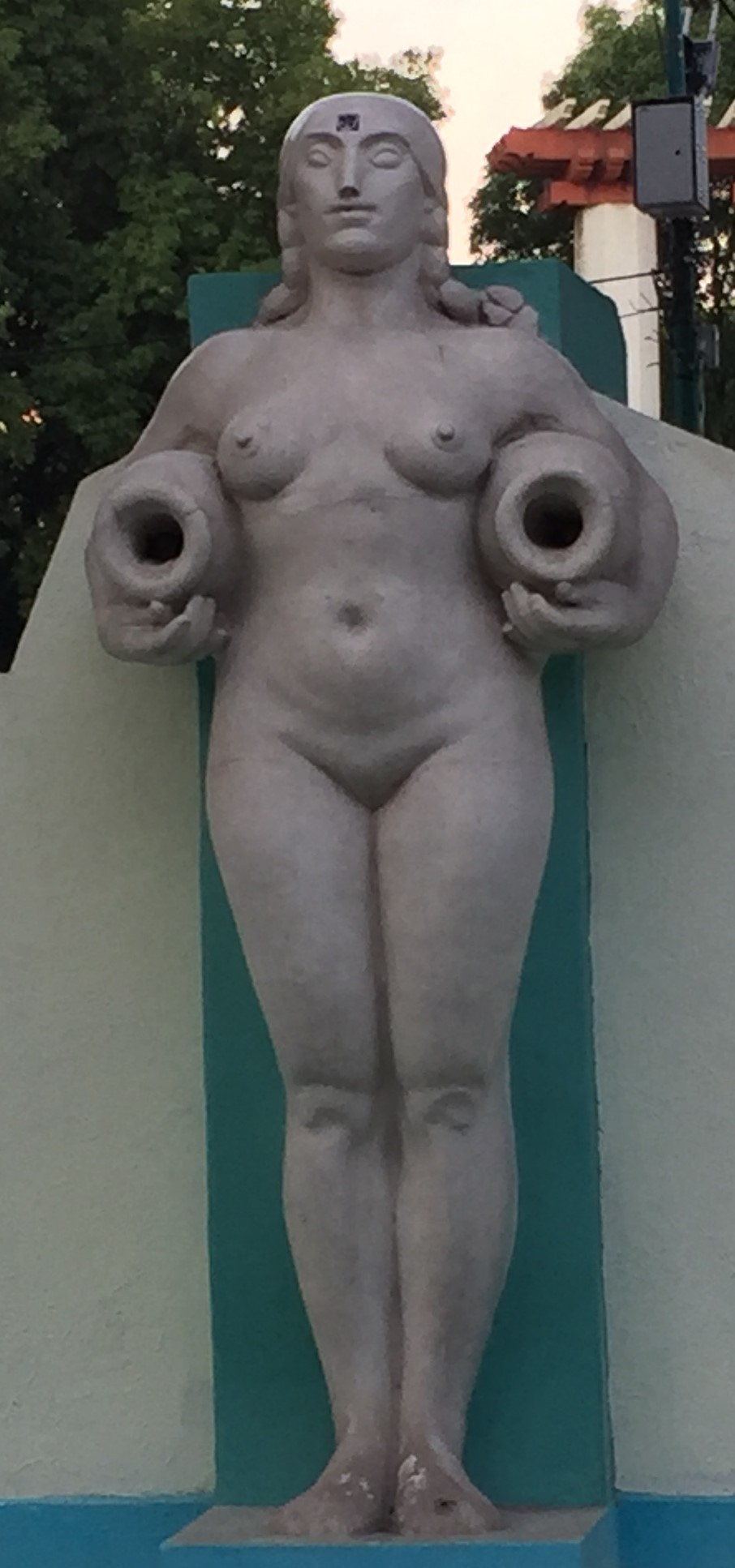
Detail of Statue

Fuente de los Cántaros is an outdoor fountain and sculpture of an Indigenous woman in Mexico City's Parque México, in Mexico, created by José María Hernández Urbina in 1927, and restored in 2008.

== Description and history ==
The fountain was created by José María Hernández Urbina, with Luz Jiménez, an Indigenous Nahua woman, as the model, in 1927. The statue, 3 m in height and constructed from concrete, depicts a naked woman with a water pitcher under each arm, from which the water flowed. Locally she is referred to as La Muñeca or the Mujer de los Cántaros. The fountain faces onto Calle de Michoacán, which divides the park, at the entrance to the Teatro al Aire Libre Lindbergh (Lindbergh Forum, named for Charles Lindbergh). (Note: Lindbergh landed his plane, Spirit of St. Louis in Mexico City on 13 December 1927, after leaving Washington DC, and the event was commemorated by naming the forum after him) Urbina, together with the architect Roberto Montenegro was one of the creators of the Forum, with its Art Deco features, in the 1920s, at the time that Colonia Condesa was being developed. The statue has come to symbolize the Mexican people (Mexicayotl or Mexicanidad) before The Conquest. The Forum was poorly maintained, and fell into disrepair, but in 2008 a restoration began at a cost of 21 million pesos over 17 months, but was considered controversial by local residents. The fountain is considered an important landmark and attracts many visitors.

== In popular culture ==
The statue has become symbolised in stencil graffiti on the walls of Mexico City, and has been replicated in fibreglass for a film and is a frequent subject for artists.

== See also ==
- 1927 in art

== Bibliography ==
- Garcia, Marisol Flores (2002). "Parque México o San Martin". Guía de recorridos urbanos de la colonia hipódromo. Universidad Iberoamericana. pp. 130–135. ISBN 978-968-859-468-1.
- "Mexico's Most Famous Model". Scraper. 2015. Archived from the original on November 1, 2015.
- Diaz, Pedro (21 January 2019). "El Parque México, el emblema inolvidable de la Ciudad". Excélsior (in Spanish).
- Quintero, Josefina (10 September 2008). "En el parque México, ecocidio, no rescate, aseguran colonos". La Jornada (in Spanish).
- "La fuente de los cántaros: Parque México". ComARevista (in Spanish). Universidad Anáhuac. 9 February 2017.
- "La fuente de los Cántaros". Punto Destino (in Spanish).
- Potters, Cristina (15 March 2014). "Stencil Graffiti: Art and Politics on Mexico's Walls". Mexico Cooks!.
- "La Mujer de los Cántaros". Vida de Peatón (in European Spanish). 6 January 2011.
- "Fuente de los Cántaros". Wizards Unite World Map.(map)
