= 100th anniversary of the Armenian genocide =

Commemoration of 100 years of the Armenian genocide
- The official logo for the genocide centenary was a Forget-me-not flower
- Date: 24 April 2015
- Location: Armenia and Armenian diaspora
- Also known as: Centenary (also, incorrectly, 'Centennial') of the Armenian genocide
- Participants: Armenians worldwide and supporters

The 100th anniversary of the Armenian genocide (Armenian: Հայոց ցեղասպանության 100-րդ տարելից, romanized: Hayocʻ cʻeġaspanutʻyan 100-rd tarelicʻ) was commemorated on 24 April 2015. 24 April 1915 is considered the beginning of the Armenian genocide, and is commonly known as Red Sunday, which saw the deportation and execution of many Armenian intellectuals.

Armenian Genocide Remembrance Day was first observed on 24 April 1919 in Constantinople, Ottoman Empire, (now Istanbul, Turkey), as a commemoration of the victims of the genocide.

The event occurred in light of continued Armenian genocide denial by Turkey.

== Lead up ==
=== Armenia ===
On 23 April 2011, a state commission coordinating of the events dedicated to the 100th commemoration of the Armenian genocide was founded by a presidential decree. It was headed by the Armenian Genocide Museum-Institute director Hayk Demoyan. The first meeting of the commission was held on 30 May 2011, and chaired by President Serzh Sargsyan.

Shavarsh Kocharyan, the Armenian Deputy Foreign Minister, stated in June 2012 that "the efforts that have been initiated are important not only for our country and the Diaspora, but for the entire world. The unpunished crimes against humanity and their denial create fertile ground for recurrence of similar events." He claimed that "by denying the Genocide, the leadership of modern Turkey resembles the Ottoman Turkish government which perpetrated the Genocide."

On 5 July 2013, during a forum of Armenian lawyers in Yerevan about the anniversary of the genocide organized by the Ministry of Diaspora, Armenia's Prosecutor General Aghvan Hovsepyan made a "sensational statement". He stated:

Indeed, the Republic of Armenia should have its lost territories returned and the victims of the Armenian genocide should receive material compensation. But all these claims must have perfect legal grounds. I strongly believe that the descendants of the genocide must receive material compensation, churches miraculously preserved in Turkey's territory and church lands must be returned to the Armenian Church, and the Republic of Armenia must get back its lost lands.

According to the ArmeniaNow news agency, "this was seen as the first territorial claim of Armenia to Turkey made on an official level. The prosecutor general is the carrier of the highest legal authority in the country, and his statement is equivalent to an official statement. Although, Giro Manoyan, Director of the International Secretariat of the Armenian Revolutionary Federation (Dashnaktsutyun) Bureau in Yerevan, commented on the development, saying that it was still impossible to say that Armenia had made a formal claim to Turkey."

In response, the Turkish Ministry of Foreign Affairs released a statement on 12 July 2013, saying that Hovespyan's statement:

...reflects the prevailing problematic mentality in Armenia as to the territorial integrity of its neighbor Turkey and to Turkish-Armenian relations and also contradicts the obligations it has undertaken towards the international organizations of which it is a member, particularly the UN and the OSCE. One should be well aware that no one can presume to claim land from Turkey.

Opposition politician and 2013 presidential election runner-up Raffi Hovannisian stated that:

The 100th anniversary does not imply an end to the struggle. The struggle is continual. The 100th anniversary is not a limitation period; it marks the divide which has to force Turkey to decide between paying reward without preconditions and accepting the Armenian people's victory.

Vartan Oskanian, Armenia's Foreign Affairs Minister from 1998 to 2008, stated in 2013 that he has:

Noticed a change in the emphasis of our political, spiritual community and the society as a whole. It is high time we went from recognition of the Genocide to the elimination of its consequences. It means being ambitious in defending our own rights, in claims for compensation for the material, spiritual, intellectual and moral losses.

=== Armenian diaspora ===
The Lebanese-based Catholicos of Cilicia Aram I stated in May 2011 that the 100th anniversary of the genocide was "not a regular date" and that the Armenian organizations and institutions "should consider thoroughly our actions and words." He suggested a "need to change our behavior" and called on Armenia:

...to act as a state, while the Diaspora should set its tasks more clearly and all the Armenians should unite. Our people's demand on the Armenian Genocide recognition should be presented to the world. We need to unite and speak only about our demands.

He went on to explain:

For 100 years, we stressed the remembrance of the Genocide. We lit candles, organized commemorative evenings, and published books. These important activities will imbue our youth with the sacred testament and souls of our martyrs. Yet, we should not singly focus on this subject. For 100 years, we reminded people through demonstrations, lobbying, and raising our voices. We aim to continue these activities with different approaches. However, it is imperative that we stress our demands for restitution.

Armenian American writer Harut Sassounian claims that "the Turkish government and its agents are closely monitoring all announced Armenian plans, so Ankara could prepare its counter-moves to the anticipated Armenian 'Tsunami'." In his words, Turkey "would be helping to publicize the Armenian Cause" by attempting to counter the upcoming genocide centennial activities.

==== Memorials ====
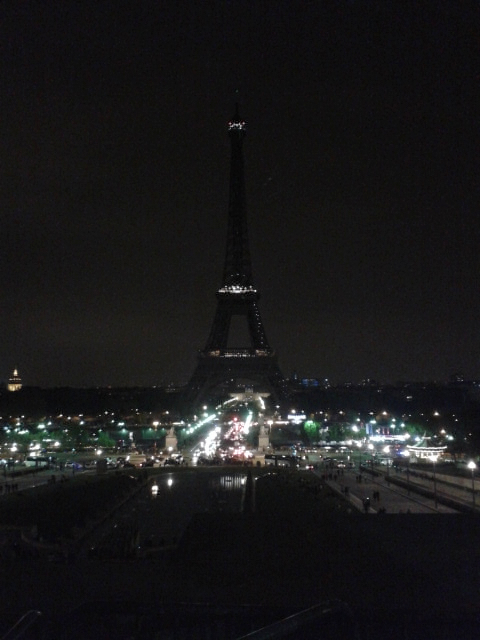
Eiffel Tower goes dark in commemoration of the 100th anniversary of the Armenian genocide.

In July 2013, the construction of the Armenian Genocide Museum began in Montevideo, Uruguay. Uruguay, which was the first country to officially recognize the Armenian genocide in 1965, thus became the first country besides Armenia to build a museum dedicated to the Armenian Genocide "at the initiative of the state." The Ministry of Education and Culture along with the Armenian community of Uruguay was expected to complete the construction of the museum on the 100th anniversary of the genocide.

In September 2013, the Pasadena City Council approved the proposal for a genocide memorial, which was expected to be completed by 24 April 2015.

It was expected that the Armenian Genocide Museum of America in Washington DC to be opened in 2015. In addition, the Montebello Genocide Memorial in California was expected to become a historical landmark in 2015, coinciding with the genocide centennial.

== Reaction ==
=== Armenian Church ===
On 23 April 2015, the Armenian Apostolic Church held a ceremony outside of the Etchmiadzin Cathedral in Vagharshapat to canonize the victims of the Armenian genocide. The ceremony was held to coincide with the start of the killings, ending at the symbolic time of 19:15 with a bell ringing 100 times. Armenian churches around the world likewise rang a bell 100 times at 19:15 local time. The ceremony, which created around 1.5 million new saints, was the first canonization by the church in 400 years. Catholicos Karekin II remarked, "The canonization of the martyrs of the genocide brings life-giving new breath, grace and blessing to our national and ecclesiastical life. The blood of the Armenian martyred for Christ has placed the seal of unshakeable faith and patriotism on the sands of the desert". Among those in attendance of what is believed to be the largest canonization service in history was President Serzh Sargsyan.

=== Turkey ===
Even though that milestone is two years away, in 2015, the country [Turkey] is already questioning how the anniversary will be treated: as a chance for reconciliation and full recognition of the massacres by the Ottoman Army or an occasion for more tension and hate speech.

— Tim Arango, The New York Times, April 2013

Official

In an address to Turkish envoys, Turkish Prime Minister Recep Tayyip Erdoğan stated:

We should all be ready and well-equipped so that the 1915 events can be dealt in an objective, scientific and realistic way. The Armenian diaspora is making its preparations to turn the events of 1915 into a political campaign by [distorting] the historical reality. In contrast to this political campaign, we will firmly stand against them by highlighting historical and scientific data.

Non-official

According to the Turkish journalist Mehmet Ali Birand:

Armenians are almost approaching the end in their genocide claims. They have made the world accept their claims by working continuously like industrious ants for 100 years. While they were explaining their pain and what they had to live through, we did not even discuss among ourselves what had happened. We buried our heads in the sand and have reached these days. We could not reply in a persuasive manner. We lost the case.

İshak Alaton, Turkish businessman, stated in 2012 that:

Apology is a sign of maturity and it is time for Turkey to grow up ... There is little time left until 2015 when Turkey will face a huge campaign by the Armenian lobby, which claims it will be the 100th year of Armenian genocide.

Journalist Hasan Cemal, who is the grandson of Djemal Pasha, one of the main perpetrators of the genocide, stated in 2013 that "Turkey, as a state, should apologize to the Armenians".

=== United States ===
On 10 April 2014, on the eve of the 99th anniversary, the United States Senate Committee on Foreign Relations reported to a resolution (S. Res. 410) United States Senate which condemns and commemorates the Armenian genocide, describing it as an act of "elimination of the over 2,500-year presence of Armenians in their historic homeland". Drafted by committee chairman Robert Menendez (D-NJ), it was approved by a vote of 12–5. In his statement, co-author of the resolution Mark Kirk (R-IL) made a reference to the 100th anniversary of the genocide and the importance of its recognition.

Armenia's Foreign Ministry welcomed the adoption of the resolution, describing it "an important step on the way to restoration of historical truth and prevention of crimes against humanity." The Turkish foreign ministry released a statement criticizing the adoption of the resolution, stating that the committee "has acted beyond its position, competence and responsibility by adopting by majority vote a hastily and ineptly prepared draft resolution". The statement went on to describe it as an "attempt at a political exploitation that distorts history and law [and] prejudiced initiative, which is devoid of any legal ground." In response to a question about the stance of the US government on the issue, on 11 April 2014 State Department Spokesperson Jen Psaki avoided using the word "genocide" and stated that:

Our position has long been that we acknowledge – clearly acknowledge as historical fact and mourn the loss of 1.5 million Armenians who were massacred or marched to their deaths in the final days of the Ottoman Empire. These horrific events resulted in one of the worst atrocities of the 20th century, and the United States recognizes that they remain a great source of pain for the people of Armenia and of Armenian descent, as they do for all of us who share basic universal values.

In Los Angeles on 24 April, over 130,000 people marched for 10 kilometres (6 mi) to the Turkish Consulate in the Armenian March for Justice, and the Los Angeles City Hall building was lit in purple light for a week in observance of the Armenian genocide centennial.

The campaign "Let History Decide" has been organized by the Turkish American Steering Committee in the USA. The committee also launched the Twitter hashtag #lethistorydecide. The campaign had a strong social media presence, including Twitter (@historydecide), Instagram, Facebook and the website www.lethistorydecide.org. The main slogan of the campaign was: "Unite us, not divide us." The campaign also sponsored by the Turkish government.

=== Other ===
Delegations from an estimated sixty countries attended the ceremonies for the anniversary in Armenia. This included the presidents of France, Cyprus, Poland, Russia, and Serbia and their respective delegations.

The rock band System of a Down performed in Yerevan on 23 April. The band, made up of descendants of Armenian genocide victims, had never before performed in Armenia. The concert lasted for two and a half hours and included thirty-seven songs. An estimated crowd of 20,000 braved a thunderstorm to attend the free concert in Republic Square.

An orchestral concert took place called "Revival". The concert was performed by over a hundred musicians from forty-three countries.

The lights of the Eiffel Tower and the Colosseum were both turned off in observance of the Armenian genocide centennial.

In June 2013, during the opening of the Armenian embassy in Vatican, Pope Francis stated that he wanted to visit Armenia in 2015 on the 100th anniversary of the genocide.

Pope Tawadros II of the Coptic Church of Alexandria headed an Egyptian delegation of 55 people, including clergymen, journalists and Armenians in Egypt, which participated in the events. A delegation from Lebanon was expected to include the country's ministers of foreign affairs and industry, as well as parliamentary officials. Other delegations from Syria, Lebanon, Iraq, Kuwait and the UAE also attended the anniversary.

Strategic Outlook suggested that the recognition of the genocide by Israel would be one of the main goals of Armenians worldwide in the eve of the anniversary.

On 20 April 2015, the Minister of Education and Higher Education of Lebanon, Elias Bou Saab, announced that all schools in Lebanon would be closed on 24 April in observance of the Armenian Genocide centennial.

The Armenian community in Kolkata, India, numbering approximately 150 people, along with visitors from countries such as Iran, Lebanon and Russia held a memorial service at the 300-year-old Armenian Holy Church of Nazareth in Kolkata to mark the 100th anniversary of the genocide. Armenian students at the Jawaharlal Nehru University in New Delhi organized a candle lighting ceremony in the university campus and at the Sacred Heart Cathedral in the city to mark the anniversary. A commemoration ceremony was also held at the Armenian Church in Chennai.

== Cultural impact ==
=== Films ===
In January 2011, the Armenian National Cinema Centre announced that it was holding talks with world-known film director Steven Spielberg and Armenian American screenwriter Steven Zaillian to produce a full-length feature film about the Armenian genocide. The cinema centre director Gevorg Gevorgyan stated that "On the 100th anniversary of the Genocide, we must have a film to demonstrate to the world. We want more than the films Mayrig or Ararat." Over a year later, in February 2012 the center declined the claims that Spielberg was involved in producing such on the 100th anniversary of the genocide. Vardan Abovian, the deputy director of the Armenian National Film Academy, said that they "indeed have plans on a movie on the Armenian genocide, however, this is still in the 'idea' phase and nothing has been decided yet. We are trying to find the budget." Ruzanna Bagratunyan, spokesperson for the center, stated that the movie "is a huge load of work, and we are trying to do it in time; all of us understand what this date [2015] means for the whole Armenian nation."

In February 2013 a new film project was launched by Armenian American director Artak "Sevada" Grigorian. Sevada plans to shoot a film, The Genex, dedicated to the 100th anniversary of the genocide. It was expected to appear on the big screen on 24 April 2015. It was reported that Natalie Portman and Armand Assante will be involved in the film with an expected budget of $30 million. Al Pacino and Leonardo DiCaprio are featured in the trailer.

Armenian American film director Eric Nazarian stated in 2013 that "it's time for the stories of the genocide to be told, and the more good movies out there, the merrier. On the eve of the 100th [anniversary of the Armenian genocide] we need a catharsis."

=== Books ===
The National Archives of Armenia published a three-volume book entitled Armenian Genocide in the Ottoman Turkey: Testimonies of the Survivors including eyewitness accounts of the genocide, archive documents, maps and photos.

=== Concerts ===
In 2011, Los Angeles-based Armenian singer Flora Martirosian started a series of concerts Never Again dedicated to the 100th anniversary of the genocide. The first concert took place in Los Angeles on 1 November 2011, featuring Stevie Wonder, Arto Tunçboyacıyan, Eric Benét and Alexia Vassiliou.

Since 2011, the Armenian Ministry of Culture and Pyunik human resources development foundation and the Armenian Genocide Museum-Institute present 100 concerts throughout the world dedicated to the 100th anniversary of the genocide.

In March 2015, composer Joseph Bohigian organized concerts of music by living Armenian composers in Fresno and Glendale, California to commemorate the 100th anniversary of the Armenian genocide. The concerts featured music by Bohigian, Tigran Mansurian, Eve Beglarian, Charles Amirkhanian, and others performed by the Fresno State New Music Ensemble.

On 14 April 2015, during American rapper Kanye West's visit to Armenia with then-wife Kim Kardashian to mark the 100th anniversary of the Armenian genocide, Kanye performed a free midnight concert outside of the Yerevan Opera Theatre near Swan Lake.

On 22 April 2015, an Armenian Requiem, composed by Ian Krouse, was first performed in Royce Hall at UCLA. Krouse wrote his requiem with selections from the Requiem Service of the Armenian Church and poems from Saint Gregory of Narek, Paruyr Sevak, Siamanto and Daniel Varoujan.

=== Eurovision Song Contest ===
Armenia's entry for the Eurovision Song Contest 2015 in Vienna was selected via an internal selection by the Armenian broadcaster AMPTV. The song "Face The Shadow" performed by the group Genealogy was announced as the selected entry on 11 February 2015. The selected group was created for the purpose of representing Armenia at the Eurovision Song Contest in order to commemorate the 100th anniversary of the Armenian genocide. The Armenian broadcaster extended invitations to five singers from the Armenian diaspora globally, to participate in the group.

=== Art and paintings ===
On 22 April 2015, renowned visual artist and painter Mher Khachatryan's artwork was featured in "ARMENIA 100: A Musical, Theatrical, and Artistic Tribute to Armenian Culture in Commemoration of the Genocide Centenary," at the Nazarian Center for the Performing Arts at Rhode Island College in Providence.

== See also ==
- 2015 Armenian March for Justice
- Aid to the Church in Need
- List of visitors to Tsitsernakaberd
- First World War centenary
