= Luz Jiménez =

Mexican model, educator and storyteller (1897–1965)

Photograph of Luz Jimenez and her daughter Conchita taken in 1926 by photographer Tina Modotti.

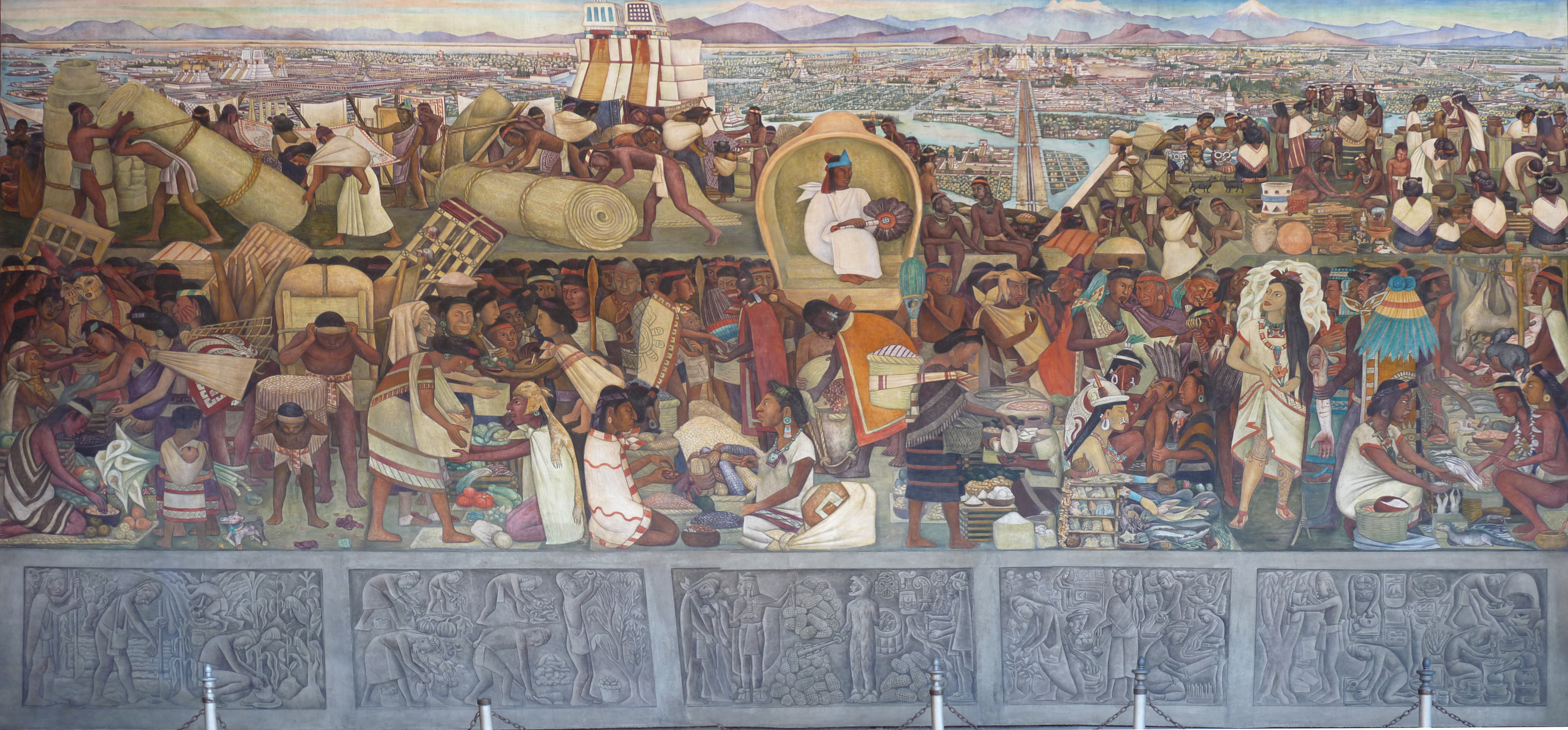
Tlatelolco Aztec market mural, at Palacio Nacional, Mexico City by Diego Rivera in 1945.

Luz Jiménez or Luciana (born Julia Jiménez González; 1897–1965) was an indigenous Mexican model and Nahuatl-language storyteller and linguistic informant from Milpa Alta, D.F.

As a young woman she witnessed the Mexican Revolution, and was present when Emiliano Zapata and his revolutionary army entered Milpa Alta in 1911. Her eyewitness account is one of the only testimonies of Emiliano Zapata speaking Nahuatl. In 1916, most of her male relatives were killed in a massacre by the Carrancistas.

In the 1930s, she served as a linguistic informant to linguists working to document the Nahuatl language. Among others she worked with Benjamin Lee Whorf who credits her in his description of Milpa Alta Nahuatl. She also worked as a model for artists Fernando Leal and Diego Rivera and her portrait can be seen in at least three of his murals, one of them the Tlatelolco market scene, La Gran Tenochtitlan vista desde el Mercado de Tlatelolco

In 1942, she started work as a model at the Escuela Nacional de Pintura, Escultura y Grabado "La Esmeralda" (National School of Painting, Sculpture and Printmaking) in Frida Kahlo's classes.

In her old age she told her life's story to anthropologist Fernando Horcasitas who published it with the title "Life and Death in Milpa Alta".

As the godparents of her daughter Concha, Jean Charlot and Anita Brenner were her compadres. Luz died in 1965 after being hit by a motorist in Mexico City.

== Works in which Jiménez appears ==
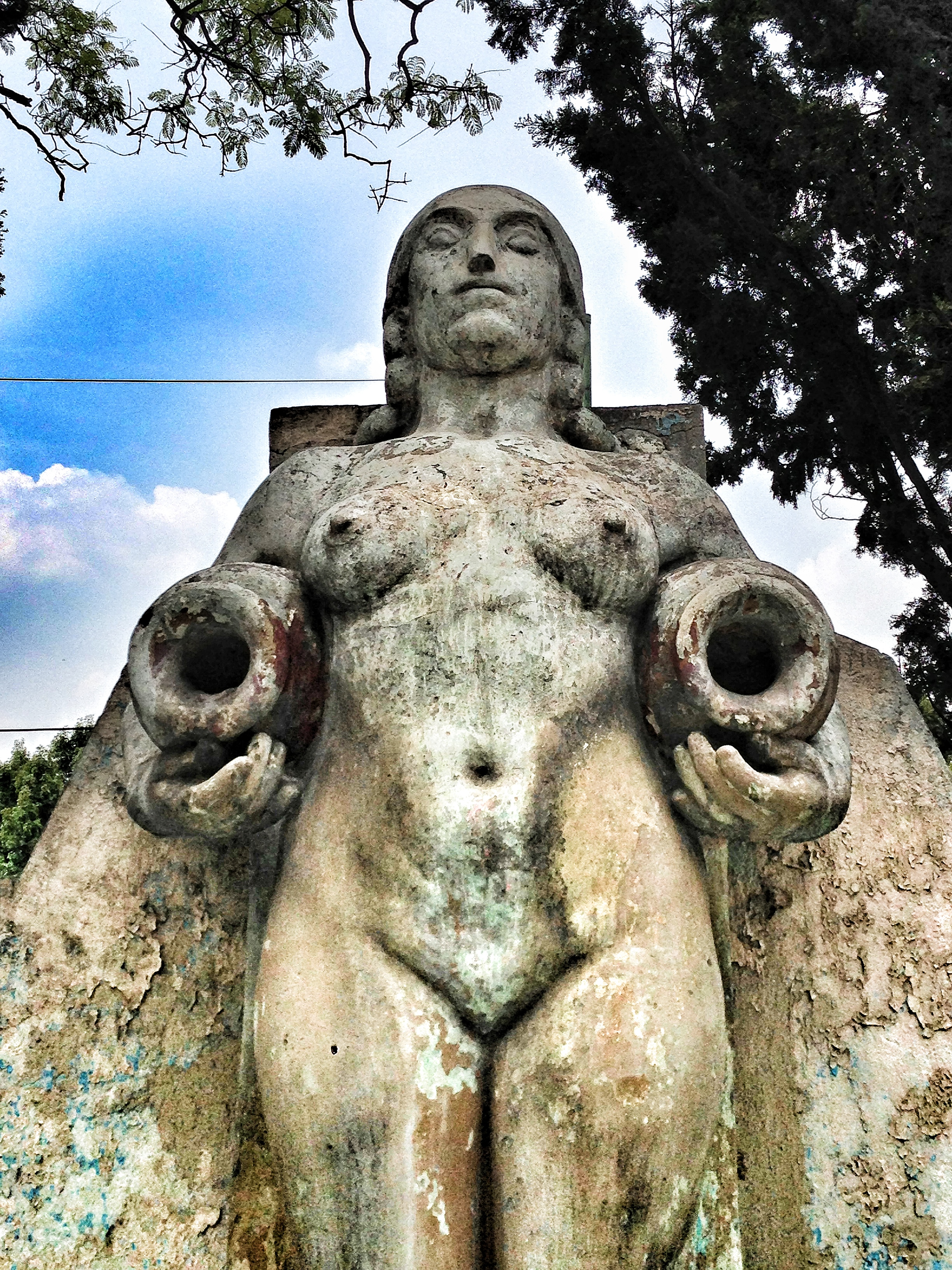
Fuente de los Cántaros (Fountain of the jugs) by José María Fernández Urbina in Parque México, Condesa, Mexico City, for which Jiménez modeled

Jiménez as a model appears inter alia in the following works:

- Fuente de los Cántaros ("Fountain of the Jugs", by José María Fernández Urbina) in Parque México, Condesa, Mexico City
- Diego Rivera:
  - La Creación, (1922), San Ildefonso College, then the National Preparatory School
  - La molendera (1926)
  - Weaving (1936) The Art Institute of Chicago
- Portrait by photographers Edward Weston and Tina Modotti (1940)
- Drawing of Luz Jiménez (April 1924) by Jean Charlot
