= Tosia Malamud =

Mexican sculptor (1923–2008)

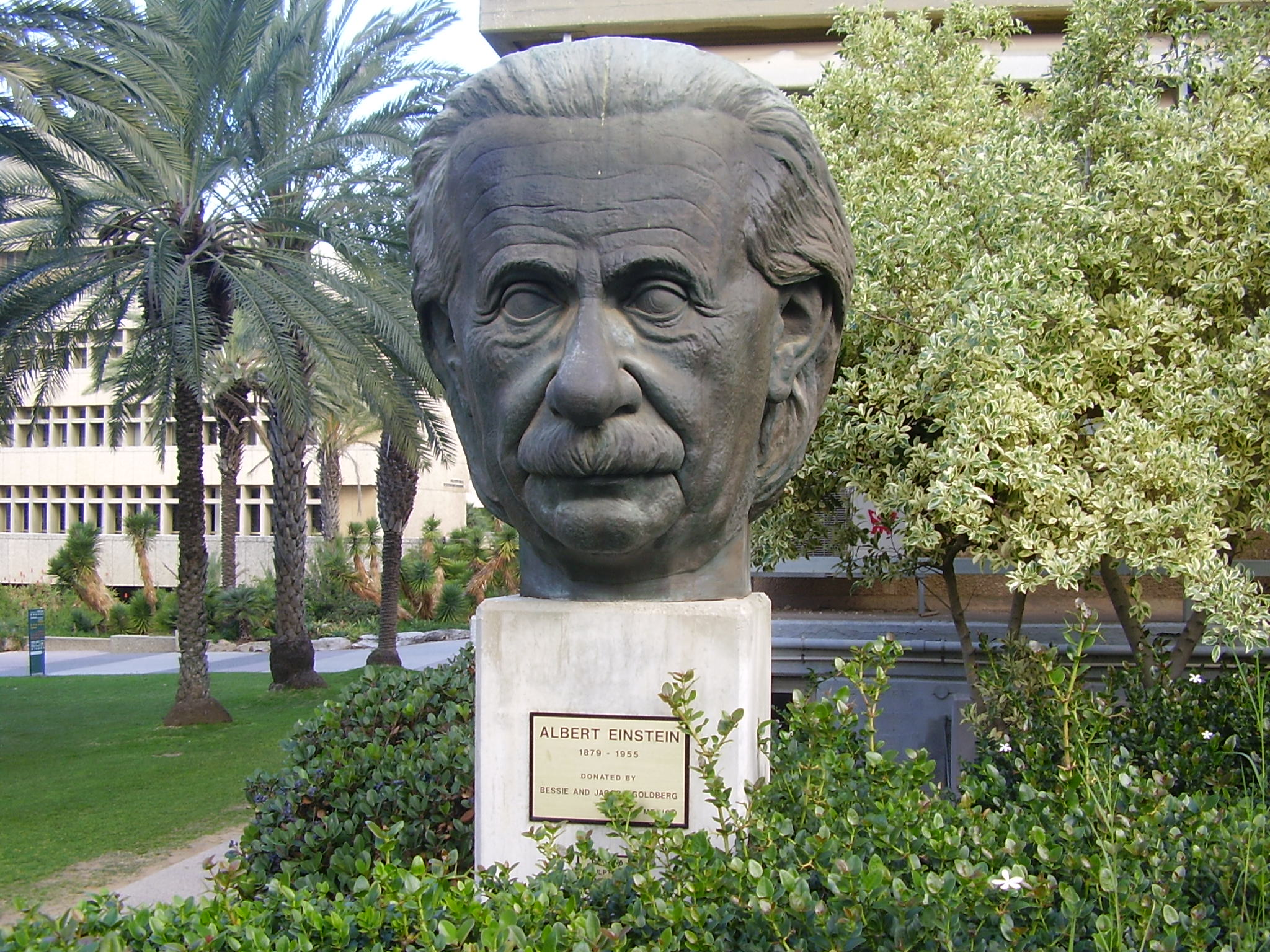
Tosia Malamud's bust of Albert Einstein.

Tosia Malamud (March 17, 1923 – July 16, 2008) was a Mexican sculptor of Ukrainian origin, one of the first female graduates of Mexico's Escuela Nacional de Artes Plásticas. Her family immigrated to Mexico when she was four, and her talent for art appeared early. She went to art college against her parents' wishes, graduating in 1943. Because of family obligations, her career did not begin until the mid-1950s with two important exhibitions that brought her style to the attention of critics. From then until her death, she exhibited her work in Mexico and abroad. She also created large and small works for public spaces. In addition to depictions of notable people, she created works mostly dealing with maternity, family and childhood which can be found in places such as the Museo de Arte Moderno and the Hospital Siglo XXI in Mexico City. La familia has become iconic for Mexico's Instituto Mexicano de Seguro Social and Viento for the Museo de Arte Contemporáneo in Morelia.

== Life ==
Malamud was born on March 17, 1923, in Vinnytsia, Ukraine as the younger child of Isaac Malamud and Liza Bakal. The family fled the country to escape the Soviet government in 1927, when she was four years old. They arrived in Mexico the same year, and there her father began the first newspaper in print shop in Yiddish where a notable book called “Di Drai Vegn” (The Three Paths) was published as well as the works of poets such as Itzjak Berliner, Yacov Glatz and Moishe Glikovsky.

Malamud attended primary and middle school in Mexico and showed interest and talent in art at a very young age. In middle school, she had the opportunity to work in ceramics, where she surprised her teacher as her ability to mold human figures.

In 1940, Malamud entered the Escuela Nacional de Arte Plasticas against her parents’ wishes. At the time, it was not considered respectable for a young woman to study art professionally. Her professors included painters Francisco Goitia, Luis Sahagún and Benjamín Coria along with sculptors Fidias Elizondo, Arnulfo Domínguez, Ignacio Asúnsolo and Luis Ortiz Monasterio. The last gave his students complete freedom to create what they wanted. She finished the five-year program in only three years, becoming one of the first female graduates from the school along with Helen Escobedo, Ángela Gurría and Geles Cabrera.

In 1944, she married Samuel Rubinstein, with whom she had two children, Ethel and Mauricio. When her children were young, she put her art on hiatus for the most part, only working at times in the hallway where there was some light. She did not have a studio until 1952, which she shared with another artist, and which allowed her to separate her work from her family life. She began her career in earnest in 1954.

In 1967, she divorced her first husband, remarrying in 1979 to writer and journalist Sergio Nudelstejer. The couple supported each other's work attending conferences and exhibitions together and even sharing workspace, half sculpture studio and half office.

Tosia Malamud died on July 16, 2008, in Mexico City.

== Career ==
Although she graduated from university in 1943, she did not begin her career in earnest until 1954. She had two important exhibitions in this year, one with the Salón de la Plástica Mexicana and the other with the Havre Gallery of the Centro Deportivo Israelita, which brought her work to the attention of critics. Her sculpture was different from that of most others in Mexico as it emphasized depiction of motion. Her career continued until her death, and during this time she had over forty individual exhibitions in Mexico, the United States, Canada, Spain, the Netherlands, Bulgaria and Israel and participated in many more collective shows. Major early exhibitions include one at the Palacio de Bellas Artes in 1959 and an exhibition of sculptures at the Olympic Village for the 1968 Summer Olympics. During the latter event, one of the pieces, La maternidad (Maternity) was stolen and recovered and today can be seen at the Museo de Arte Moderno in Mexico City. Her last major exhibition while still alive extended from November 2007 to March 2008 at the Instituto Mexicano de Seguro Social building on Paseo de la Reforma in Mexico City, curated by her son Mauricio. This event was a retrospective held in conjunction with the release of her autobiography, but the artist could not attend because of her health.

Her work can be found in both private and public collections in both Mexico and abroad. Some of her work was sponsored by the government of Mexico through the Department of Culture of the Secretariat of Foreign Relations and the old National Council of Tourism. She created thirty-eight monumental pieces in bronze and stone which are on permanent display in institutions and public spaces in Mexico, with another fourteen in other countries. Busts of notable figures include that of writer I. L. Peretz located at the Nuevo Colegio Israelita, several of Albert Einstein in Parque México, and the Faculty of Sciences at Tel Aviv University, Rosario Catellanos at the Faculty of Philosophy and Letters of UNAM, Franz Kafka at the National Library of Mexico, along with those Miguel Hidalgo, José María Morelos y Pavón, Benito Juárez and Venustiano Carranza located at the Mexico Building of the Tel Aviv University. Other types of sculpture include La maternidad at the Museo de Arte Moderno, La familia in front of the Hospital Siglo XII in Mexico City, Pareja Amorosa in the city of Monterrey, La madre, primera maestro at the Centro Deportivo Israelita and Penélope located on Paseo de la Reforma. Some have become icons including La famila at the Hospital Siglo XXI and another called Viento, now the symbol of the Museo de Arte Contemporáneo in Morelia.

She was a member of the Salón de la Plástica Mexicana, the Sociedad de Geografía y Estadística, the Academia Internazionale Tommaso Campanella in Rome and the Asociación Española de Pintores y Escultores in Madrid. In 2008, her biography called Tosia Malamud-La material tras la forma was published by CONACULTA; and in 2009, the Salón de la Plástica Mexicana held a posthumous tribute.

== Artistry ==
Her work during school and soon after was influenced by her teachers, especially Fernando Ortiz Monasterio and Ignacio Asúnsolo which had both conservative and liberal elements. Upon graduation, she was not interested in the Mexican muralism movement and its nationalism which was dominant at the time, rather she preferred a more international outlook. She went counter much of Mexican art for several reasons. First Mexican art was dominated by men, especially monumental sculpture. Sculpture in general was less valued at the time than painting, especially mural painting. During her career, she focused on sculpture mostly working with bronze and marble, but also experimented with other materials such as acrylics, stone and ceramics. She created pieces in small, medium and monumental sizes.

"Golden age, hands of the Quixote" is a metallic sculpture of hers for the character of Don Quixote.

Her 1957 sculpture "El beso" (The Kiss) was carved chiluca stone and featured in First National Biennial of Culture of 1962. Mujer reclinada o recostada received an honorable mention at the Second Sculptural Biennial in 1964.

She principally created two kinds of sculpture. The Mexican Diario Judio described her in 2012 as being "considered the country's foremost sculptural portrait artist". Non-bust works mostly focused on themes such as maternity, children, female torsos, bodies in movement and poses indicating reflection. She stated shortly before her death that her main theme was always love in its various forms because she felt it was the basis of life. These works have been classified as abstract figurativism and were done in bronze, stone and wood. However, they show influence from neo figurativism, impressionism, cubism, fantasy art and semi abstract art. Although she was not part of the Mexican muralism movement, her art was also influenced by Mexican culture, especially its pre-Hispanic elements.
