= Hayk Demoyan =

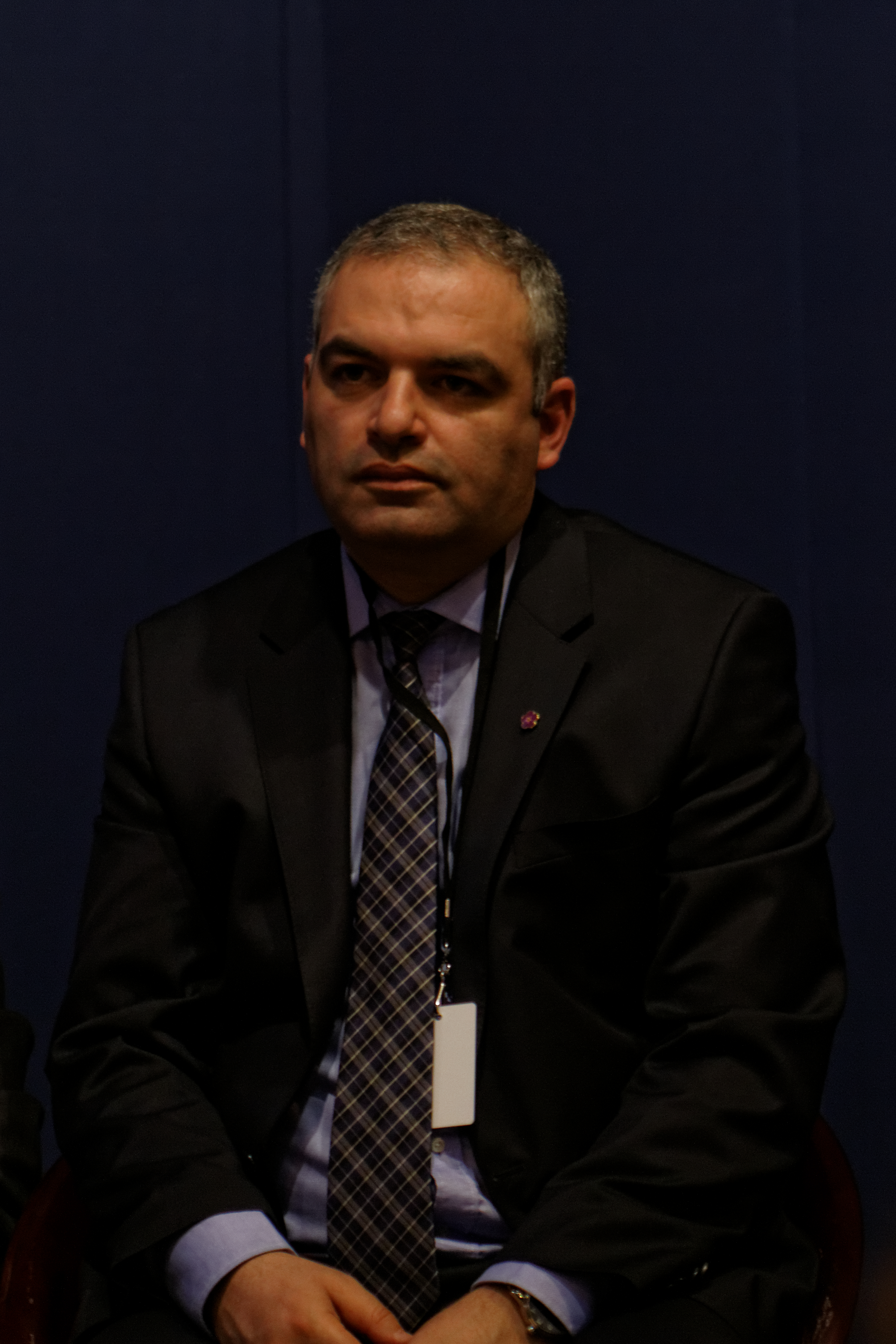
Hayk Demoyan in 2015

Hayk Demoyan (Armenian: Հայկ Դեմոյան; born 1975, May 22) is an Armenian historian who served as the Director of the Armenian Genocide Museum-Institute in Yerevan, Armenia from 2006 to 2018.

Demoyan was born in the city of Leninakan (now Gyumri) in Soviet Armenia. He is a graduate of Yerevan State University and received his Ph.D. from the Institute of Oriental Studies of the Armenian National Academy of Sciences. From 2002 until 2005 he was a lecturer at the History Department of Yerevan State University. He is also a researcher and has written several books on such topics as the Armenian Genocide, Turkish foreign policy and Turkey's involvement in the Nagorno-Karabakh conflict of 1991–1994.

In addition to being the director of the Armenian Genocide Museum-Institute, he was also the Secretary of the state commission tasked with preparing the worldwide commemoration of the Armenian Genocide's centenary in 2015.

Demoyan regularly delivers speeches and lectures in Armenia and abroad. He has been invited to speak on the Genocide Museum's activities and related topics in several countries, including the United States, the United Kingdom, France, Russia, Lebanon, Austria, Slovenia and Cyprus. He is fluent in Armenian, Russian and English.

== See also ==
- Armenian genocide
- List of Armenian genocide memorials
