= Flora Martirosian =

Background information
- Born: February 5, 1957; Leninakan, Armenian SSR, Soviet Union (now Gyumri, Armenia)
- Died: November 20, 2012 (aged 55) Los Angeles, California, U.S.
- Genres: folk
- Occupation: singer
- Instrument: vocal
- Website: floramartirosian.com

Flora Artashesi Martirosian (Armenian: Ֆլորա Արտաշեսի Մարտիրոսյան; February 5, 1957 – November 20, 2012) was an Armenian folk singer, founder of the "Artists for Peace Charity Foundation”, and initiator of the cultural movement “Never Again”.

== Biography ==
Flora Martirosian was born on February 5, 1957, in Leninakan (now called Gyumri) to a family of an athlete and a housewife. She inherited her vocal skills from her mother.

Martirosian studied at the Gyumri Musical School. She graduated from the Yerevan State Conservatory. Her participation in the Garun 73 contest in 1973 brought her the first prize. Martirosyan won her first international award in the Hamburg International Festival in 1978. The song “Tsovastghik” (author: Gusan Ashot) which brought the singer great fame, was recognized as a top song for 15 years. In 1987, she married Hrahat Gevorgyan, a journalist.

Martirosian performed guest concerts in over 60 countries around the world. She and her family moved to Los Angeles, California, in 1987 and returned to Yerevan in 1997. Martirosian was the principal of Yerevan's Armen Tigranyan Musical School between 1997-2001. She then again moved to Los Angeles after her husband received an appointment. Martirosian founded the Komitas Musical Academy in Los Angeles in 2002. In 2005, she and Christine Pepelyan won "the Best Duet" award in Los Angeles.

In 2007, she established the Artists for Peace Charity Foundation, which attracted a large number of world-renowned singers and Hollywood superstars who joined under the slogan "Never Again" to raise their voice of protest against genocides. Martirosian gave her first concert in Los Angeles in 2011.

== Death ==
Martirosian died on November 20, 2012. Complications of a gallbladder surgery are thought to be the cause of her death. She was buried in Yerevan's Komitas City Pantheon on December 12, 2012.

The then-President of Armenia Serzh Sargsyan stated that she was "truly national", then continued with "audiences, which she collected in homeland and in the diaspora, talk about the ethnic routes of her songs, which she has earned as a distinctive singer and Armenian artist".

== Discography ==
- Tsov Astghik (1994)
- Uni Veradardz (1998)
- Kangnir Qaravan (2002)
- Qele Lao (2002)
- Yeraz Tesa (2003)
- Im Ughin (2005)
- Menq (2007)
- Paylogh Astgher (2007)
