= Foro Lindbergh =

Plaza in Mexico City

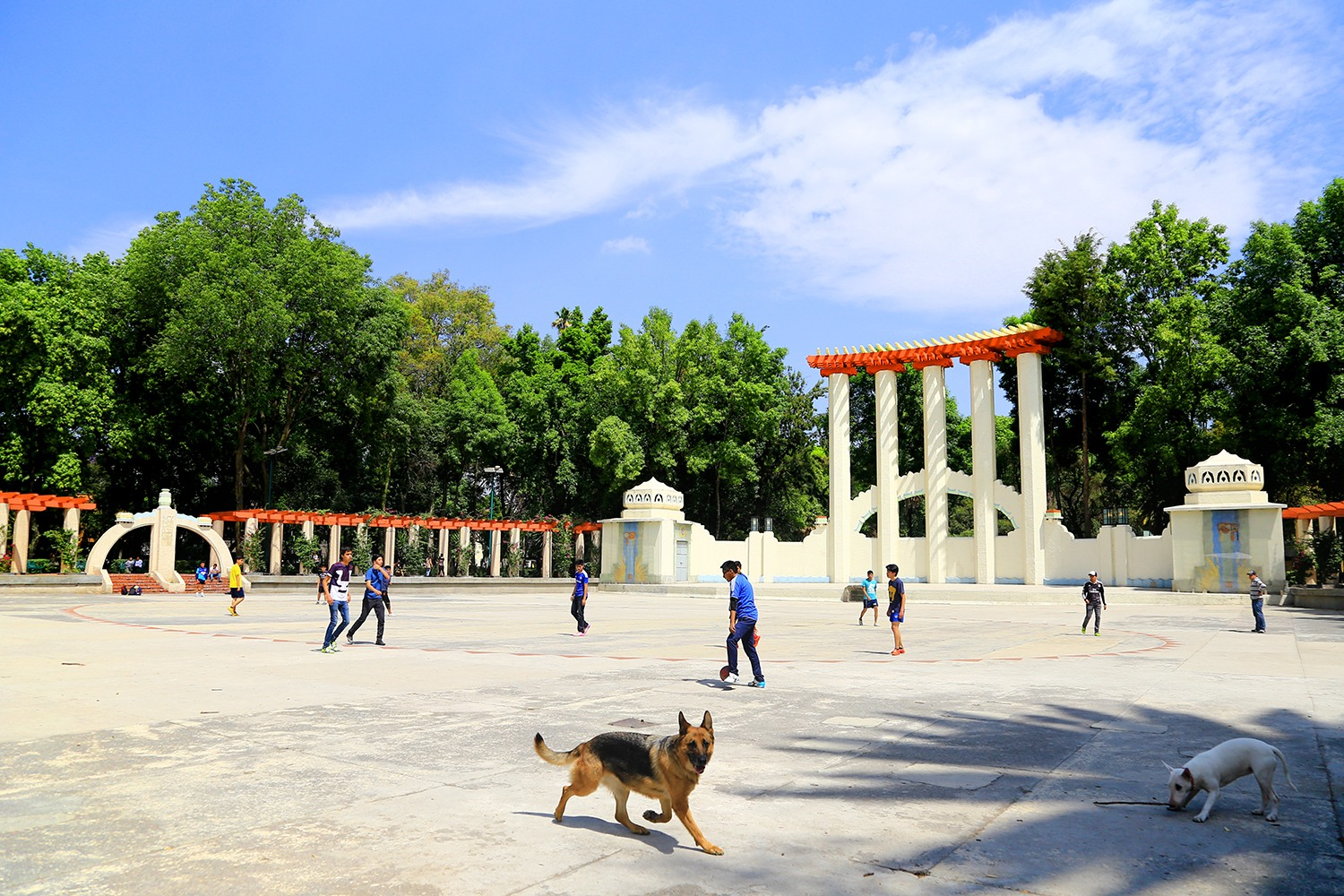

- Location within Mexico
- Type: Plaza
- Location: Mexico
- Coordinates: 19.4117438°N 99.1694409°W

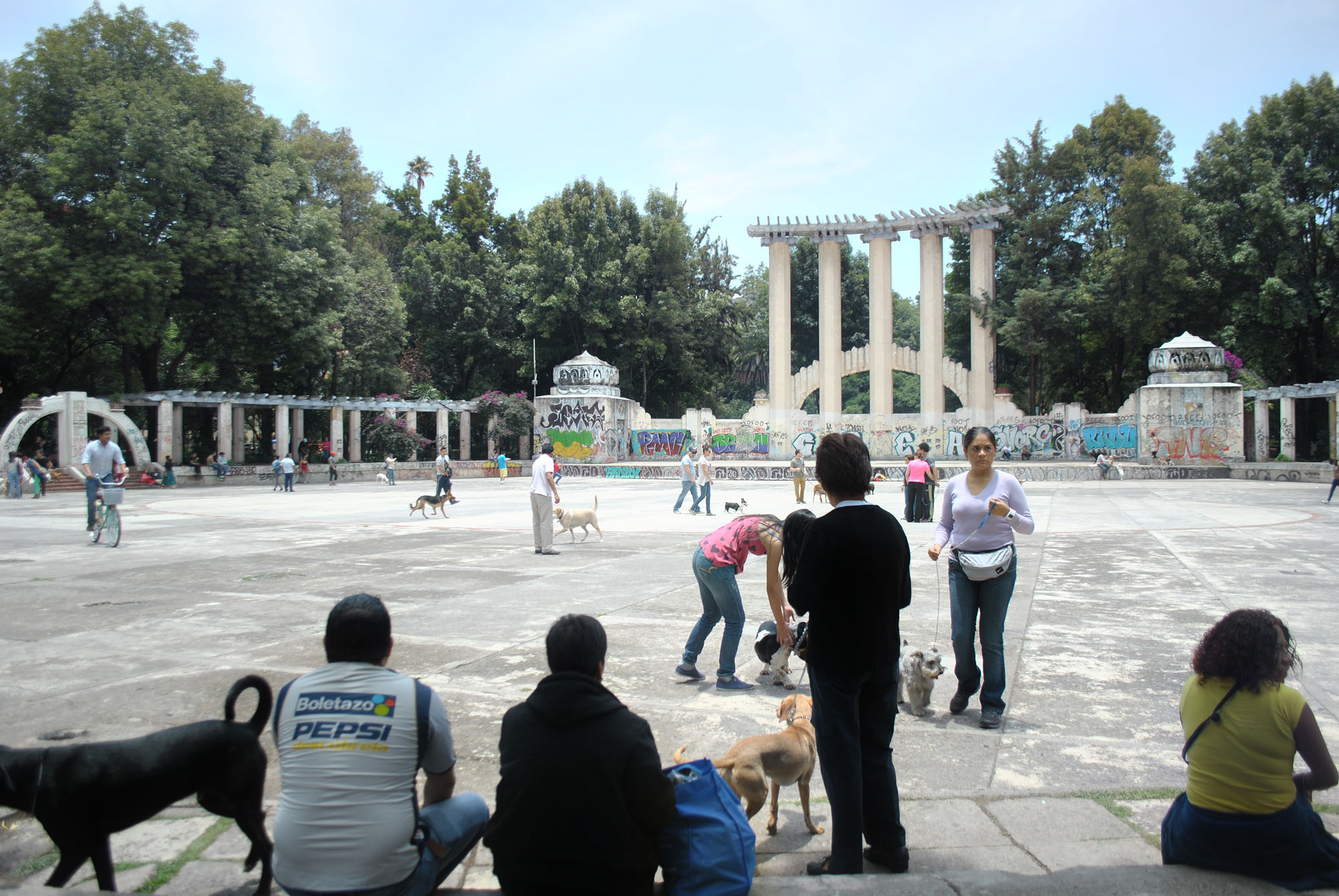
Graffiti at Foro Lindbergh before its renovation

Foro Lindbergh (Lindbergh Forum) is a plaza in Mexico City's Parque México. Recognized for its artistic and architectural value, Foro Lindbergh was built in 1927 by the architect Leonardo Noriega and the engineer Javier Francisco Stávoli Llamas in an art deco style; it was restored in 2013–2015, and in 2023 following political vandalism.

== History ==
Charles Lindbergh crossed the Atlantic Sea on a nonstop flight from New York to Paris on May 20, 1927. He visited Mexico City on December 14, 1927, to be celebrated for the feat. The United States Ambassador to Mexico Dwight W. Morrow and Mexican President Plutarco Elias Calles were among the dignitaries present. The Government of Mexico City honored Lindbergh by giving his name to the forum of the recently completed Hipódromo Condesa neighborhood.

== See also ==
- List of Art Deco architecture in the Americas
