= 2015 Armenian March for Justice =

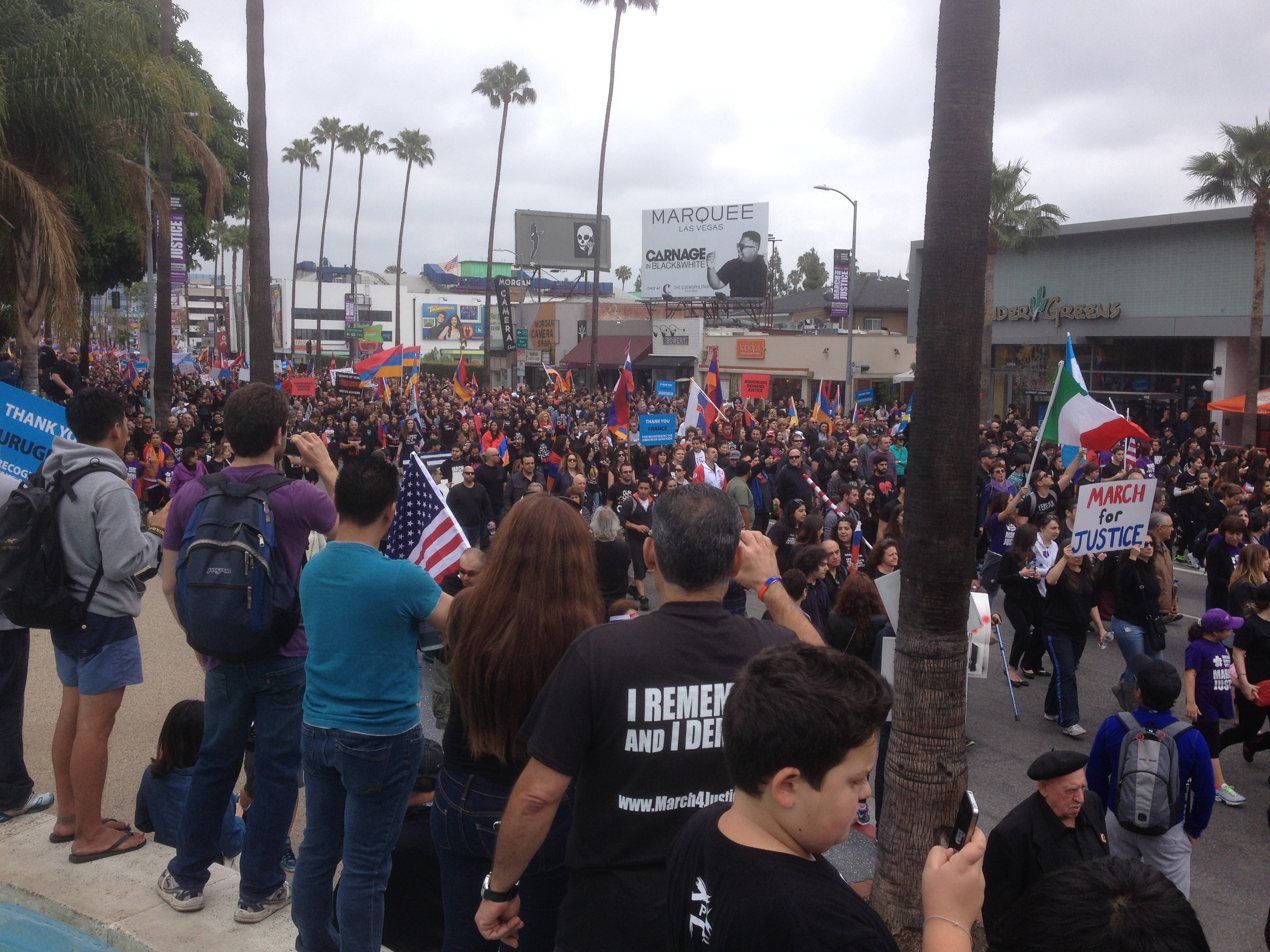

The March for Justice on April 24, 2015 was a six-mile march of over 130,000 participants from the neighborhood designated as Little Armenia in Hollywood to the Turkish consulate of Los Angeles, demanding recognition of the Armenian genocide, which Turkey denies.

== Speakers ==
Los Angeles Mayor Eric Garcetti said “From Mount Hollywood to Mount Ararat, today we cry and we cry out for those who were lost and those who are living,” he said. “One hundred years later, we shouldn’t have to take to the streets.”

Los Angeles Councilman Paul Krekorian spoke of his great-grandmother receiving a letter about what happened to her brother, a math professor at Euphrates College in eastern Turkey. The brother had been seized by Turkish agents, who pulled the beard from his face. His tongue was cut out and he was left to die.

== Counter-protest ==
About 30 pro-Turkey counter-protestors gathered briefly at the Turkish consulate. There was a verbal confrontation, and eggs and water bottles were tossed. The LAPD asked the pro-Turkey demonstrators to leave as the pro-Armenian crowd approached the consulate.

== Forget-Me-Not ==
Many purple Forget-Me-Not flowers were displayed during the march, as this was the designated symbol of the centennial of the Armenian Genocide.
