= List of anti-monuments in Mexico =

Anti-monuments are installed in Mexico (antimonumentos in Spanish) during popular protests to recall a tragic event or to maintain the claim for justice to which federal and local governments have failed to provide a satisfactory response in the eyes of the complainant. These are erected for issues related to forced disappearances, massacres, femicides and other forms of violence against women, or any other act of violence.

== Anti-monuments by topic ==
Because most of the anti-monuments are unnamed anonymous works, and the press refers to them simply as "Antimonumentos", some names are unofficial and use recognizable elements to distinguish them from other similar works.

=== 2014 Iguala mass kidnapping ===
The first anti-monument in the country features a "Plus 43" and a "Because they were taken alive, we want them alive!" slogan written in Spanish in reference to the 43 students that were kidnapped as they were traveling to commemorate the anniversary of the 1968 Tlatelolco massacre. Six other students were killed that night. In 2018, a concrete turtle whose shell contains 43 little turtles and whose limbs bear the names of the students, was built in front of the anti-monument.

Picture	Name	State	Location	Date of installation	Condition
A giant sculpture that reads "Plus 43". Below, it is written in Spanish "Because they were taken alive, we want them back alive!"	Antimonumento +43	Mexico City	Esquina de la Información, Paseo de la Reforma Avenue, Colonia Centro	26 April 2015	In place
A concrete turtle whose shell contains 43 colorful turtles	Antimonumento +43	Mexico City	Esquina de la Información, Paseo de la Reforma Avenue, Colonia Centro	25 September 2018	In place

=== 2009 Hermosillo daycare center fire ===
The first anti-monument has a 49 and the letters "ABC" in reference to the name of the daycare where the 49 children were killed. The daycare was owned by the Mexican Social Security Institute (IMSS). Two years later, multiple bronze statues of children's shoes with the names of the victims were placed next to it. In 2020, a second anti-monument features 49 white crosses were installed in front of the Secretariat of the Interior Offices.

Picture	Name	State	Location	Date of installation	Condition
A giant sculpture that reads "49 ABC". Next to it, the phrase "never again" is written in Spanish.	Antimonumento 49 ABC	Mexico City	IMSS Headquarters, Paseo de la Reforma Avenue, Colonia Juárez	5 June 2017	In place
Several bronze sculptures of toddlers's shoes. The phrase "justice" is written in Spanish.	Antimonumento 49 ABC	Mexico City	IMSS Headquarters, Paseo de la Reforma Avenue, Colonia Juárez	5 June 2019	In place
49 crosses with the names of the children killed during the fire.	#JusticiaABC	Mexico City	Secretariat of the Interior Offices, Abraham González Street, Colonia Juárez	3 November 2020	Removed or relocated

=== Kidnapping of David Ramírez and Miguel Ángel Rivera ===
David Ramírez and Miguel Ángel Rivera were kidnapped on 5 January 2012. Although the ransom payment was made, both were not returned and their whereabouts or conditions are unknown. The plaque calls for padlocks to be placed as a sign of protest.

Picture	Name	State	Location	Date of installation	Condition
The figure of a man with an intermediate line dividing two different shades of blue.	Rescatemos a David y Miguel	Mexico City	Esquina de la Información, Paseo de la Reforma Avenue, Colonia Juárez	5 January 2018	In place

=== 2006 Pasta de Conchos mine disaster ===
Erercted to honor the 65 miners that died during the 2006 Pasta de Conchos mine disaster. The main anti-monument features a 65 number that supports a plus symbol. The symbol has written a legend that says "With one voice, rescue now!", as well as the names of all the victims of the collapse. The following year, behind the structure, a cage with 63 helmets with the names of the victims that were not rescued was placed; these are buried with charcoal lumps.

Picture	Name	State	Location	Date of installation	Condition
A giant sculpture that reads "Plus 65". The plus symbol has the phrase With one voice, rescue now! inscribed.	Antimonumento +65	Mexico City	In front of the Mexican Stock Exchange Building, Paseo de la Reforma Avenue, Colonia Juárez	18 February 2018	In place
Multiple helmets are enclosed and buried by coal rocks	Antimonumento +65	Mexico City	In front of the Mexican Stock Exchange Building, Paseo de la Reforma Avenue, Colonia Juárez	19 February 2019	In place

=== 1968 Tlatelolco massacre ===
In honor to the victims of the 1968 Tlatelolco massacre. The anti-monument features a white dove and a plaque that blames the federal government and the Mexican Armed Forces for the massacre.

Picture	Name	State	Location	Date of installation	Condition
The anti-monument presents a dove soaring, with "1968" written on the bottom, "2 October, it is not forgotten" and "It was the army, it was the state" slogans.	2 de Octubre	Mexico City	In the corner of Madero Street and the Zócalo, Colonia Centro	2 October 2018	In place

=== Violence against women ===
The first Spanish, an anti-monument installed to demand justice for the victims of gender violence and femicides in the country, was the Antimonumenta in Mexico City. It was placed by mothers and relatives of victims of feminicide, during the march #8M for the 2019 International Women's Day. Since then, multiple Spanish have been installed throughout the country.

Picture	Name	State	Location	Date of installation	Condition	Ref.
A symbol of Venus with a closed fist raised in the center. It has inscribed the phrases "In Mexico, 9 women are murdered every day" and "not a single one more!" in Spanish.	Antimonumenta	Mexico City	In front of the Palace of Fine Arts, Juárez Avenue, Colonia Juárez	8 March 2019	In place	
	Antimonumenta	San Luís Potosí	Plaza de Armas, historic center of San Luis Potosí City	27 October 2019	Destroyed	
alt:Two crosses, one erect and the other bent. On the first one is written the phrase "My voice will never die", while on the two there are multiple names written.	Cruz de Vida	Mexico City	Paseo de la Reforma and Avenida de los Insurgentes	1 December 2019	In place	
alt:A park with the sculpture of a symbol of Venus surrounded by several crosses.	Antimonumenta	State of Mexico	In front of the municipal palace of Ciudad Nezahualcóyotl	25 November 2019	In place	
A symbol of Venus with a closed fist raised in the center. It has written the phrases "neither forgiving nor forgetting" and "no more femicides" in Spanish.	Antimonumenta	Jalisco	Plaza de Armas, Colonia Centro, Guadalajara	25 November 2020	In place	
A red bench with a plaque that reads "In memory of all the women murdered by those who claimed to love them or just because they were women" in Spanish.	Antimonumenta (Banca Roja)	Jalisco	In front of the Rotonda de los Jaliscienses Ilustres, Hidalgo Avenue, Colonia Centro, Guadalajara	25 November 2020	In place	
	Memorial por víctimas de feminicidio	Hidalgo	Plaza Juárez, Colonia Centro, Pachuca	25 November 2020	In place	
	Antimonumenta	Quintana Roo	Chetumal Congress, Colonia Barrio Bravo, Chetumal	30 November 2020	In place	
	Antimonumenta	Veracruz	Parque Apolinar Castillo, Colonia Centro, Orizaba	7 March 2021	Removed	
	Antimonumenta	Veracruz	Port of Veracruz, Colonia Ignacio Zaragoza, Veracruz City	8 March 2021	In place	
	Antimonumenta	Michoacán	Fuente de las Tarascas, Colonia Centro, Morelia	8 March 2021	Replica in place	
A sculpture of a woman raising her fist in the air lies on a plinth.	Glorieta de las mujeres que luchan	Mexico City	Former Columbus Roundabout, Paseo de la Reforma, Colonia Juárez	25 September 2021	In place	
	Antimonumenta	Oaxaca	Fuente de las 8 Regiones, Colonia Reforma, Oaxaca City	25 November 2021	In place	
	Antimonumenta	Yucatán	Paseo de Montejo, Mérida	25 November 2021	In place	
A sculpture covered with memories of people and in the center has a plaque that reads: "Antimonumenta, Alive Monument. Dedicated to all women victims of the machista Nuevo León. 15 May 2022	Antimonumenta, Monumenta Viva	Nuevo León	Government Palace of Nuevo León, Monterrey	15 May 2022	In place	
	Antimonumenta	Hidalgo	Parque Hidalgo, Pachuca	24 November 2023	Relocated	
	Antimonumenta	Durango	Colonia Chapala, Gómez Palacio	8 March 2026	In place	

=== 2008 New's Divine fire ===
To honor the victims killed during the New's Divine nightclub tragedy. It was installed in memory of those killed during the event.

Picture	Name	State	Location	Date of installation	Condition
	Antimonumento del New's Divine	In front of National Palace, Zócalo, Centro	Mexico City	22 June 2019	Removed

=== Killing of Samir Flores Soberanes ===
Samir Flores Soberanes opposed the construction of a federal hydroelectric plant in his community. He was killed the day after he attended an assembly and challenged the accuracy of the information being presented, describing the consultation as a simulation and accusing the federal government of promoting a disinformation campaign. One year after his assassination, a bust was placed in the school named after him in the community of Amilcingo, Morelos. The next day, after a related march in Mexico City, a replica of the bust was placed in the Zócalo square.

Picture	Name	State	Location	Date of installation	Condition
Bronze bust of a man with indigenous features in his 30s.	Bust of Samir Flores Soberanes	Morelos	Amilcingo, Temoac Municipality	20 February 2020	In place
Bronze bust of a man with indigenous features in his 30s.	Bust of Samir Flores Soberanes	Mexico City	Zócalo, Colonia Centro	21 February 2020	In place

=== Killing of cyclists ===
Consisting of ghost bikes, it was erected to honor cyclists killed in the country, demanding greater road safety for cyclists.

Picture	Name	State	Location	Date of installation	Condition
	Antimonumento a las víctimas viales	Mexico City	In front of the Secretary of Mobility of Mexico City	19 February 2021	In place

=== 2010 San Fernando massacre ===
Erected in honor of the 72 migrants murdered during the 2010 San Fernando massacre. It was installed to remember that migration is a human right.

Picture	Name	State	Location	Date of installation	Condition
A monument that reads as Plus 72. It also has written in Spanish the phrase "Migration is a human right" (Migrating is a human right).	Antimonumento +72	Mexico City	In front of the then-Embassy of the United States Building, Paseo de la Reforma, Colonia Juárez	22 August 2020	In place

=== 1971 Corpus Christi massacre ===
To honor the victims of the 1971 Corpus Christi massacre. The anti-monument features a red V and phrases that blame the federal government of Mexico for the massacre.

Picture	Name	State	Location	Date of installation	Condition
A letter V is placed on top of a pedestal. The pedestal has written the phrases "50 years after the state crime", "10 June 1971–2021" and "The struggle continues!" in Spanish.	Antimonumento a El Halconazo	Mexico City	Juárez Avenue and Humboldt Street	10 June 2021	In place

=== Missing persons ===
Disappearances and missing person cases in Mexico are frequent. The first related anti-monument was installed with the permission of the Puebla City Council, residents placed photographs of several missing persons on trees in the streets of the historic center. The next day, the photographs were removed to place Christmas decorations.

The second anti-monument was the Glorieta de las y los Desaparecidos in Mexico City, installed by collectives that sought to make visible the numbers of missing persons. The anti-monument was removed by the city government but was reinstalled days later.

A third anti-monument was installed at the Angel of Independence roundabout on 12 July 2026, but it was removed a few hours later.

Picture	Name	State	Location	Date of installation	Condition
	Árbol de la Esperanza	Puebla	Historic center of Puebla	5 December 2021	Removed
A Montezuma cypress surrounded by multiple posters with photos of missing persons.	Glorieta de las y los Desaparecidos	Mexico City	Glorieta de la Palma roundabout	8 May 2022	In place
	México, campeón en desaparición	Mexico City	Angel of Independence roundabout	12 July 2026	Removed

=== Opposition to the Mayan Train ===
To visibilize the impact to the Mayan jungle and its human and animal population, it was installed by environmentalists protesting against the Mayan Train, which passes through several jungle zones. The plaque reads, "Here we put on record that in the name of 'development' and 'progress' the Mayan Train was built, evicting people, extinguishing species, devastating the jungle, and threatening ecosystems. Only you, in the future, will be able to say if it was worth it..."

Picture	Name	State	Location	Date of installation	Condition
Anti-monument denouncing destructive Maya Train project in Avenida Reforma	Antimonumento al Tren Maya	Mexico City	Esquina de la Información, Paseo de la Reforma Avenue, Colonia Centro	23 November 2022	In place

=== Death of Giovanni López ===
Giovanni López died while in police custody on 4 or 5 May 2020. A few days later, on 25 May, George Floyd was killed in Minneapolis, United States, in similar circumstances sparking national and international protests. López's brother released his arrest video a month later, which caused hundreds of young people to gather in downtown Guadalajara on 5 June. The local government arrested multiple people that day

Police officers arrested and disappeared demonstrators for hours. The original anti-monument was installed adjacent to the Antimonumenta on the third anniversary of what protesters dubbed as "El Halconazo Jaliciense". The sculpture was removed by the government the day it was installed. A month later, protesters created a removable replica.

Picture	Name	State	Location	Date of installation	Condition
A sculpture depicting a "5J".	Antimonumento 5J	Jalisco	Plaza de Armas, Colonia Centro, Guadalajara	5 June 2023	Removed
A light sculpture depicting a "5J".	Antimonumento 5J	Jalisco	Plaza de Armas, Colonia Centro, Guadalajara	5 July 2023	Existing, but removable

=== Liga Comunista 23 de Septiembre ===
To honor the eople who were killed or disappeared by the government of Mexico in their struggle to establish a communist government in the country. Placed during the 50th anniversary of the creation of the Liga Comunista 23 de Septiembre.

Picture	Name	State	Location	Date of installation	Condition
	Liga Comunista 23 de Septiembre	Jalisco	Plaza San Andrés, Colonia San Andrés, Guadalajara	23 September 2023	In place

=== Transgender visibility ===
Installed during the International Transgender Day of Visibility, in front of the municipal palace of Aguascalientes City.

Picture	Name	State	Location	Date of installation	Condition
	Antimonumentx	Aguascalientes	Municipal palace, Colonia Centro, Aguascalientes	31 March 2024	Removed
	Antimonumentx	Aguascalientes	Municipal palace, Colonia Centro, Aguascalientes	31 March 2025	In place

=== Ecological disaster in Sonora ===
Installed during the tenth anniversary of a Grupo México mining company dumping 40,000 cubic meters of acidified copper sulfate leachate into the Bacanuchi and Sonora rivers.

Picture	Name	State	Location	Date of installation	Condition
	Antimonumento al desastre de los ríos de Sonora	Sonora	Plaza Emiliana de Zubeldía, Colonia Centro, Hermosillo	7 August 2024	In place

=== Gaza genocide ===
Placed by collectives protesting against the Gaza genocide carried out by Israel during the Gaza war.

Picture	Name	State	Location	Date of installation	Condition
	Puerta de la Resistencia y la Vida	Mexico City	Benito Juárez Hemicycle, in front of the Secretariat of Foreign Affairs building, Colonia Juárez	19 August 2025	In place

=== Violence against journalists ===
An anti-monument named Aquí Nadie Olvida was installed by family members of journalists and media workers killed in Mexico, more than 200 killed and 30 disappeared since 2000.

Picture	Name	State	Location	Date of installation	Condition
	Aquí Nadie Olvida	Mexico City	Esquina de la Información, Paseo de la Reforma Avenue, Colonia Juárez	30 May 2026	In place

== Other ==
Similar sculptures have been installed claiming for justice in similar topics, although their installers have not dubbed them as anti-monuments.

=== 2021 Mexico City Metro collapse ===
#FueMorena (lit. 'Was MORENA') was a temporary political stunt installed by members of the National Action Party (PAN) on the eve of the first anniversary of the Mexico City Metro overpass collapse, where 26 people died. It was installed in front of the Antimonumento +43 at the Esquina de la Información, where Paseo de la Reforma, Avenida Juárez and Avenida Bucareli converge. The politicians described it as an antimonumento and they blamed the National Regeneration Movement Party (MORENA) for the collapse and the lack of justice surrounding the investigations.

The installation received negative criticism from activists who have placed anti-monuments, considering it disrespectful and an appropriation of their movement for political purposes, adding, "[t]o them, as to all political parties, we demand respect, that you refrain from looking at the big debts just to win votes. As long as you do not resolve them, you are accomplices of impunity". MORENA politicians called their PAN counterparts "opportunistic vultures" and called the installation an act of politicking.

Picture	Name	State	Location	Date of installation	Condition
	#FueMorena	Mexico City	Esquina de la Información, Paseo de la Reforma Avenue, Colonia Centro	2 May 2022	Removed

=== Femicide in Chihuahua ===
Media and activists consider it the precursor of the Antimonumenta, it was installed to visibilize femicide in Ciudad Juárez.

Picture	Name	State	Location	Date of installation	Condition
	Cruz de Clavos	Chihuahua	In front of the Government Palace of Chihuahua in the Chihuahua City	5 November 2001	Replica in place
	Cruz de Clavos	Chihuahua	At the El Paso PDN Port of Entry, Ciudad Juárez	13 March 2002	In place

=== Disappeared people in Jalisco ===
Installed at the Monumento a los Niños Héroes traffic circle in Guadalajara, with government authorization, it was transformed by families of missing persons and activists into a site of public remembrance and protest. The space contains photographs, names, and messages referring to people who have disappeared in Mexico, and it serves as a meeting point for demonstrations, vigils, and collective mourning.

Picture	Name	State	Location	Date of installation	Condition
	Glorieta de las y los Desaparecidos	Jalisco	Monumento a los Niños Héroes, Guadalajara	8 May 2022	In place

=== Victims of violence in Mexico ===
The Memorial to Victims of Violence in Mexico was created by the Mexican federal government to honor and publicly recognize people who have died or disappeared as a result of violence in the country, particularly in the context of the drug war and organized crime. The memorial was intended as a space for remembrance and reflection, where victims could be acknowledged and their names commemorated.

Picture	Name	State	Location	Date of installation	Condition
	Memorial to Victims of Violence in Mexico	Mexico City	Paseo de la Reforma, Chapultepec	5 April 2013	In place
