= Rescatemos a David y Miguel =

Anti-monument in Mexico City

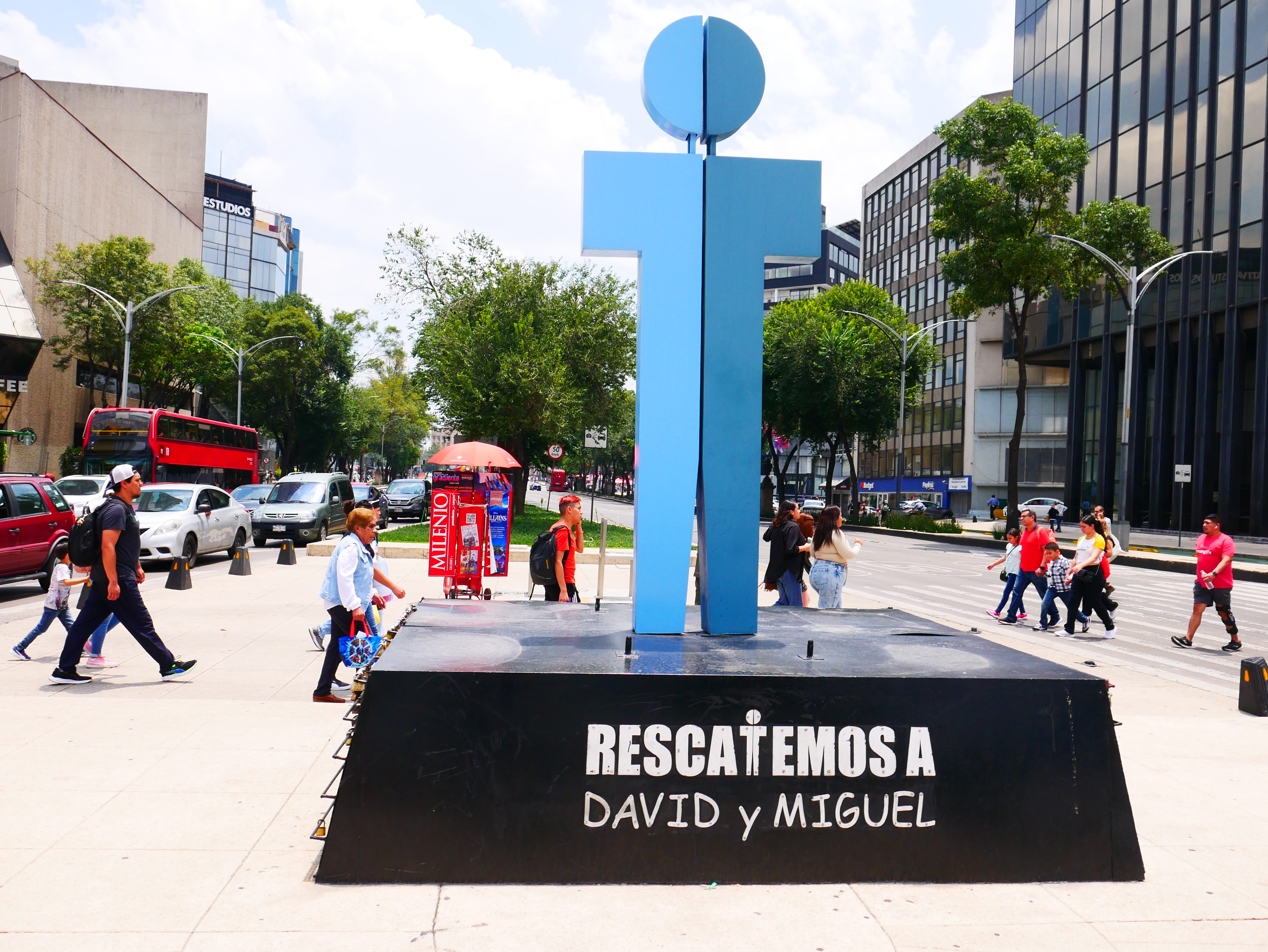
- The sculpture in 2023
- Location
- Location: Mexico City, Mexico
- Coordinates: 19°26′09″N 99°08′57″W
- Designer: Anonymous demonstrators
- Type: Antimonumento
- Material: Steel
- Height: Approximately 3 m (9.8 ft)
- Opening date: 5 January 2018
- Dedicated to: David Ramírez and Miguel Ángel Rivera

Rescatemos a David y Miguel (Note: lit. transl. "Let's Rescue David and Miguel") is an antimonumento (anti-monument) installed on Paseo de la Reforma Avenue in the Cuauhtémoc borough of Mexico City. The work included the installation of the figure of a bi-color male on a plinth. It is dedicated to David Ramírez and Miguel Ángel Rivera, two men who were kidnapped on 5 January 2012 when they were traveling to Ixtapa Zihuatanejo, Guerrero. Despite the ransom being paid, neither was returned, and their whereabouts remain unknown. The artwork was installed at the Esquina de la Información intersection, opposite the Antimonumento +43 on 5 January 2018. The sides of the base include brackets designed for attaching padlocks, used as a form of protest.

== Background ==
David Ramírez Valenzuela González and Miguel Ángel Rivera Díaz, two young adults, were traveling from Mexico City to Ixtapa Zihuatanejo, Guerrero, on 5 January 2012, to celebrate Rivera's 20th birthday. According to Lourdes, one of Ramírez's sisters, they were traveling along Mexican Federal Highway 134, a route known for its high crime rate. During the journey, while passing through Ciudad Altamirano, Guerrero, they were stopped by men dressed as police officers. Rivera texted a friend, asking him to contact Ramírez's mother because he was being restrained and forced into a vehicle. Deborah, another of Ramírez's sisters, called his phone repeatedly. When someone eventually answered, she asked if she was speaking with a police officer, but the person on the line informed her that Ramírez had been kidnapped.

The families of Ramírez and Rivera contacted the police, who assigned them a negotiator. Communication with the kidnappers lasted for two days. On the third day, the kidnappers specified the location for the ransom delivery. A relative of Rivera met with individuals dressed in military uniforms at the agreed-upon location and handed over the payment. When he inquired about the whereabouts of Ramírez and Rivera, the kidnapper told him to leave the area and wait for them a few meters ahead. After waiting for four hours, the police informed them that such exchanges could take up to two weeks. According to Ramírez's family, they were able to identify some of the kidnappers by tracking the GPS signal from his cellphone. However, the authorities have refused to pursue further investigations. Ramírez and Rivera remain officially missing, and their whereabouts and conditions remain unknown.

== History and installation ==
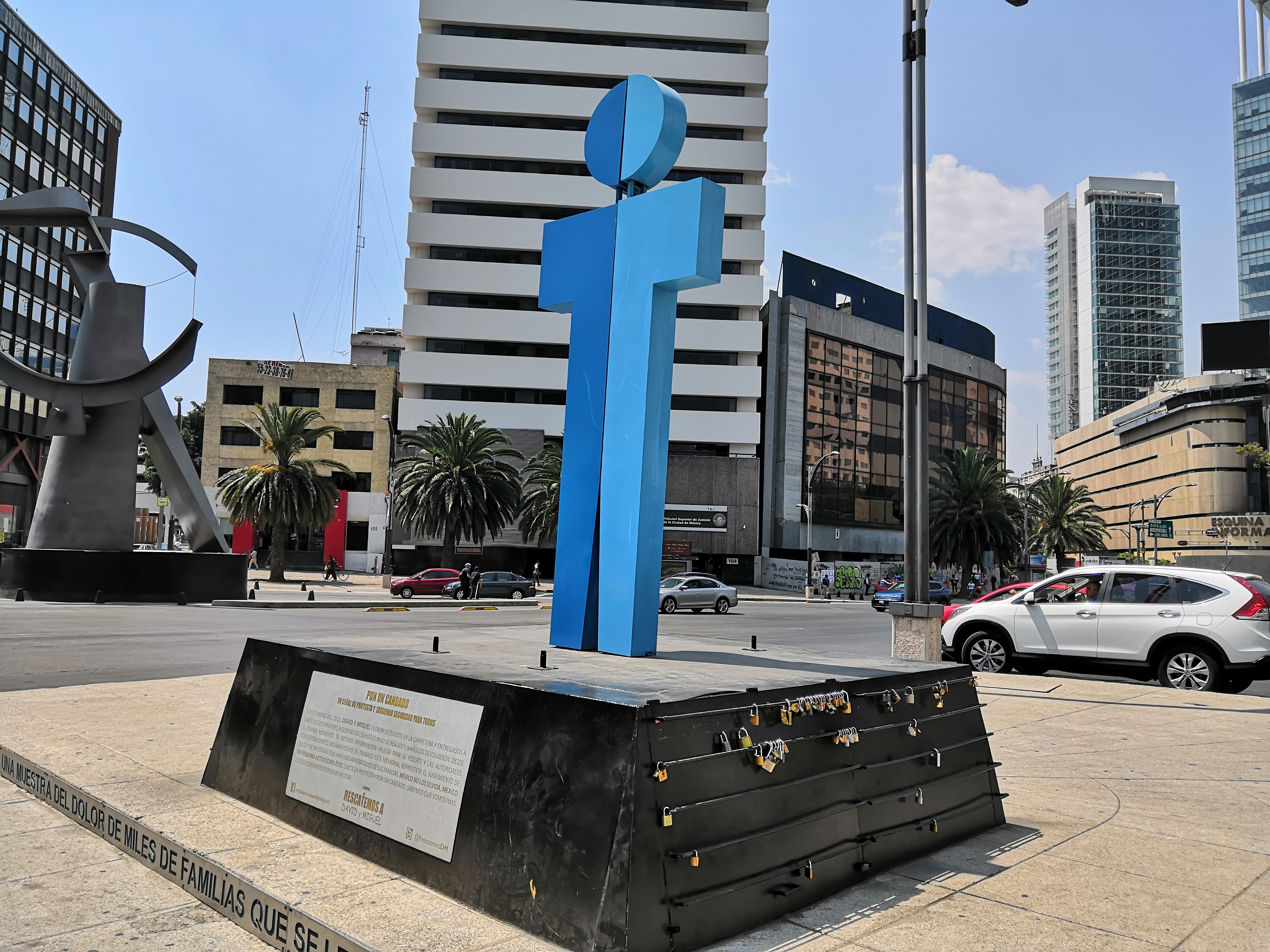
The anti-monument in 2019 with multiple padlocks

During the afternoon of 5 January 2018, family and friends of the victims installed a sculpture approximately 3 m (9.8 ft) tall depicting a male figure split in half, rendered in two shades of blue. The sculpture was placed at the Esquina de la Información intersection on Paseo de la Reforma, across from the Antimonumento +43 memorial. It was financed by Ramírez's mother, Lourdes González, and erected without official authorization. González stated that she had petitioned several government institutions for permission to install a memorial, but all declined. Planning for the installation began in June 2017 to ensure its completion by the sixth anniversary of the kidnapping.

The monument arrived in two trucks, and the family used loudspeakers to inform passersby about the installation. The base was anchored with rebar, welded in place, and filled with cement. The sculpture, composed of two interlocking pieces of different colors, was then mounted on the pedestal. It includes two plaques, one of which recounts the story of Ramírez and Rivera. The installers received threats from unidentified authorities, who warned that the sculpture would be removed. In response, the family maintained a presence at the site for six months to safeguard it.

According to González, the location was chosen for its central position and proximity to institutions that, she argued, had failed to fulfill their duties and allowed the case to remain unresolved. The base of the memorial includes brackets designed to hold padlocks, symbolizing a call for improved security in response to the thousands of kidnappings that occur in the country.
