= Esquina de la Información =

Intersection in Mexico City

- Intersection
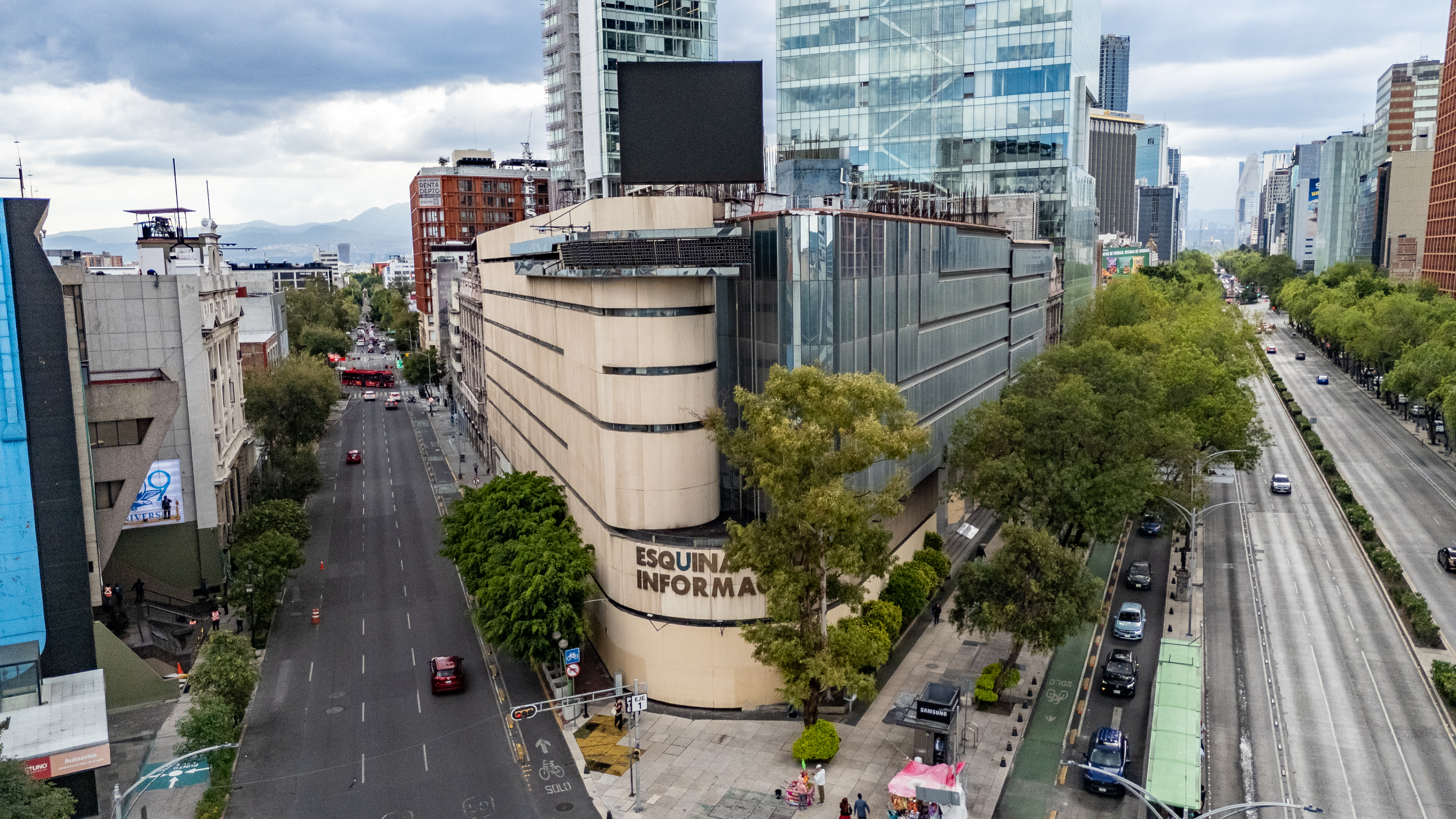
- Former Excélsior headquarters, whose building gave its name to the intersection
- Location: Cuauhtémoc, Mexico City
- Address: Paseo de la Reforma and Avenida Bucareli
- Interactive map of Esquina de la Información
- Coordinates: 19°26′06″N 99°09′00″W

The Esquina de la Información (lit. transl. Information Corner) refers to the intersection of Paseo de la Reforma and Avenida Bucareli, in Colonia Juárez, Mexico City. The name emerged due to the presence of the former headquarters of the Excélsior newspaper and, across the street, the offices of El Universal—two of Mexico's most prominent newspaper companies.

The intersection is surrounded by several notable landmarks, including the Antimonumento +43 memorial, the El Caballito sculpture, the Fuente de la República fountain roundabout, the National Lottery Building (known as Edificio El Moro), the Puerta 1808 sculpture, the Tax Administration Service headquarters (Torre del Caballito), and the Rescatemos a David y Miguel memorial. The area is served by the El Caballito BRT station.

== History ==
The intersection originally had the Glorieta del Caballito roundabout, which marked the northern end of Paseo de la Reforma. At its center stood an equestrian statue of Charles IV of Spain, colloquially known as El caballito ("the little horse"). Avenida Bucareli was constructed a few years later. In 1920, El Universal inaugurated its headquarters at Bucareli 12, and two years later, Excélsior opened its own headquarters across the street, in a building designed by engineer Efrén Rebolledo, at Bucareli 17.

In the 1980s, Excélsior built an adjacent structure on the corner of Paseo de la Reforma, named Esquina de la Información. The name referred to its role as the distribution center for various major newspapers (Excélsior and El Universal, as well as Novedades de México, La Jornada, El Nacional, La Prensa, and El Heraldo) and magazines (Cinelandia, Alarma and Lágrimas y Risas). It was also a common spot where newsboys announced newspaper highlights before their distribution. Previously, the site housed a gas station. On 1 October 2016, Excélsior ceased its operations in the building and relocated its headquarters near Ciudad Universitaria. The property was sold to Jones Lang LaSalle and by that year plans were underway to transform it into a mixed-use development called Reforma 10. However, as of 2019, no significant changes had occurred.

== Landmarks ==
The intersection converges in an area with multiple landmarks:

- Antimonumento +43, an anti-monument memorial
- Aquí Nadie Olvida, an anti-monument memorial
- Avenida Juárez, an avenue that leads to the historic center of Mexico City
- El Caballito, a sculpture that replaced the equestrian statue of Charles IV of Spain
- El Caballito BRT station, a Mexico City Metrobús stop
- Fuente de la República, a fountain sculpture
- Edificio El Moro, the National Lottery headquarters
- Puerta 1808, a sculpture
- Rescatemos a David y Miguel, an anti-monument memorial
- Torre del Caballito, the Tax Administration Service headquarters

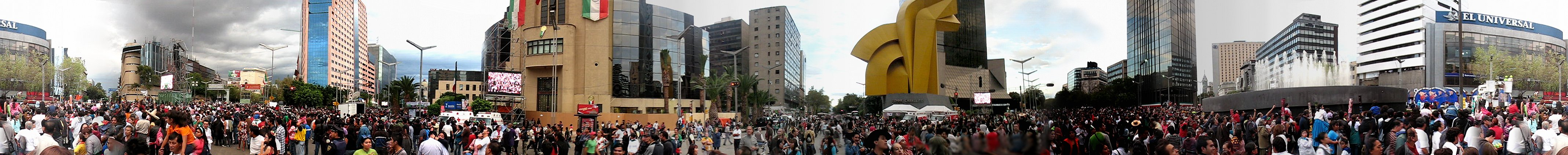
360° panoramic view of the intersection in 2010 during the celebrations of the 200th anniversary of the Mexican independence parade: From left to right, El Universal headquarters, Excélsior headquarters, Barceló México Reforma Hotel, Edificio El Moro, El Caballito sculpture, Torre del Caballito, Fuente de la República.
