= Antimonumenta (Mérida) =

Anti-monument in Mérida, Mexico

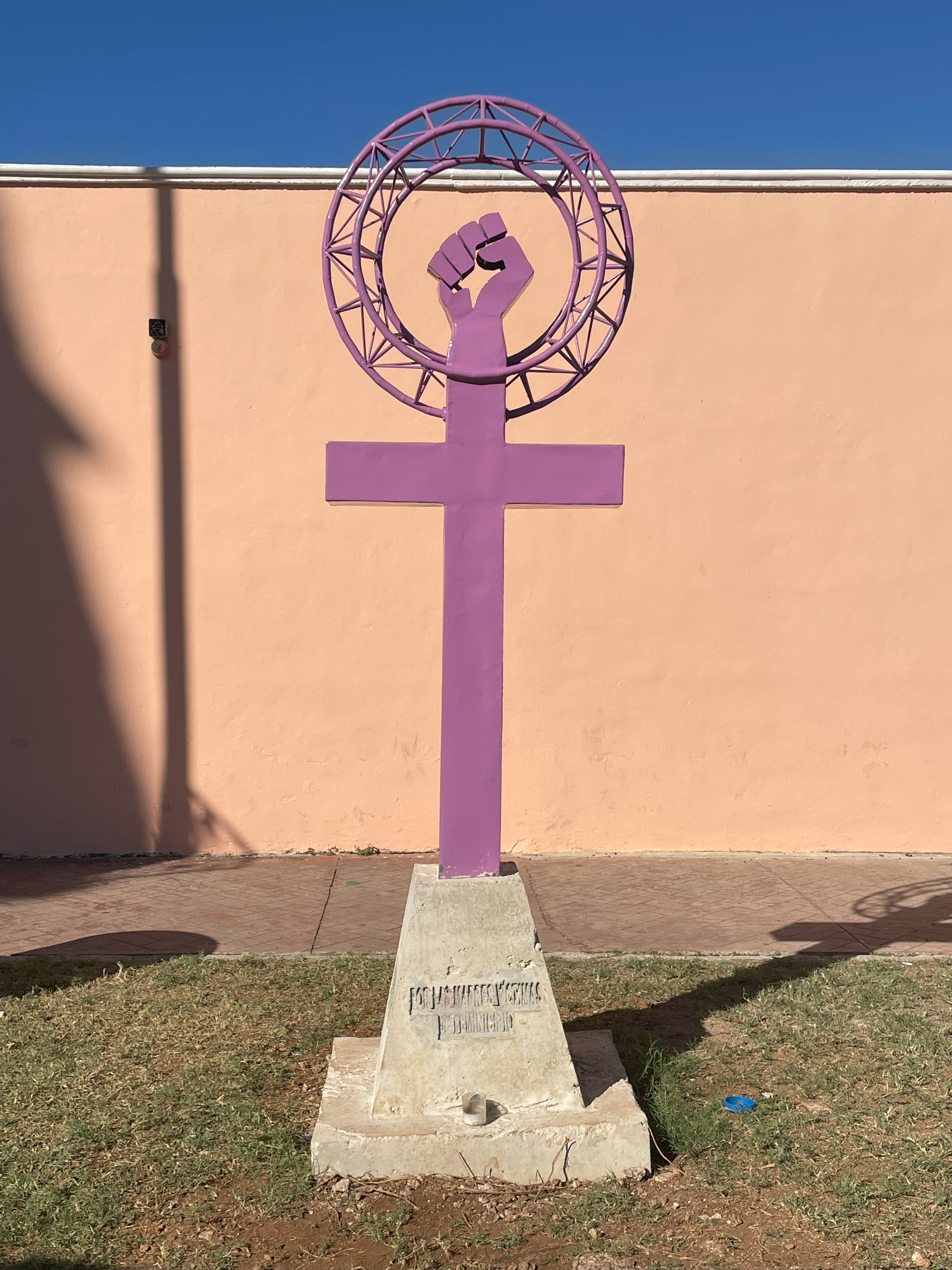
- The anti-monument one month after it was installed
- Location
- Location: Mérida, Yucatán, Mexico
- Coordinates: 20°58′30″N 89°37′11″W
- Designer: Feminists
- Type: Antimonumenta
- Material: Steel and concrete
- Height: 1.6 m (5 ft 3 in)
- Opening date: 25 November 2021
- Dedicated to: Victims of violence against women in Mexico

An antimonumenta was installed along Paseo de Montejo, in Mérida, Yucatán, on 25 November 2021, the date commemorating the International Day for the Elimination of Violence against Women, during the annual march of women protesting against gender violence. It was inspired by similar protest sculptures installed in other Mexican cities.

== Background and installation ==
The installation of the antimonument was organized by six feminist collectives, which initially proposed locating it in Parque de la Mejorada. During negotiations over its placement, several city councilors considered expediting the procedures to allow installation on the scheduled date. However, because approval from the National Institute of Anthropology and History (INAH) was required for installation in that park, alternative locations were proposed, including Paseo de Montejo Avenue, Parque de las Américas, and Parque de La Mejorada.

The original proposal to place the antimonument in Parque de La Mejorada was linked to the historical participation of women in Yucatán, as the site housed the Central School for Girls, the La Siempreviva school, and provided lodging for delegates attending the First Feminist Congress of Yucatán. However, the installation in front of the Monument to the Montejo family was considered to allow greater visibility of gender-based violence against women, as well as racism, discrimination, and other forms of violence.

Collectives requested that municipal authorities grant legal authorization for the installation of the sculpture to prevent vandalism or its removal, as has occurred with other antimonumentos in Mexico. Regarding the sculpture, Elisa Zúñiga Orellana, a city councillor and chair of the City Council's Gender Equality Commission, said:

Antimonumentas represent what society has to improve, including the lack of punishment, sentences and procedures incorrectly performed by the authorities when women are victims of gender violence.

After several proposed location changes, the Antimonumenta was installed at the end of Paseo de Montejo on 25 November 2021, coinciding with the International Day for the Elimination of Violence against Women.

Prior to its unveiling, between 100 and 300 women demonstrated in the city, requesting the eradication of violence against women. Some participants publicly denounced their aggressors, and a minute of silence was performed to honor the 78 women killed in the state between 2008 and 2021. The unveiling was performed by mothers of victims in the state, as well as survivors of different forms of violence.

== Description ==
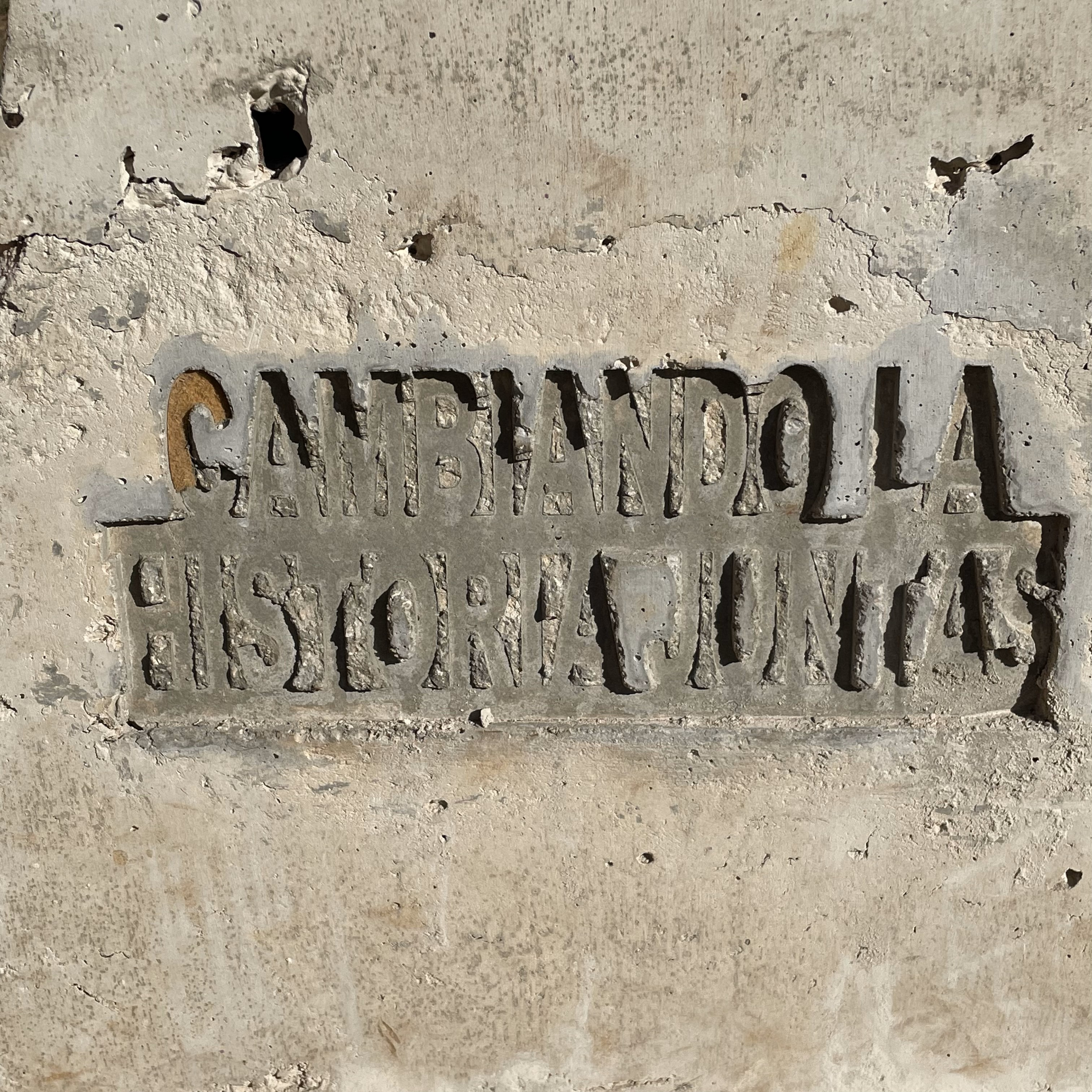
One of the inscriptions on the base: Cambiando la historia juntas ("Changing history together").

The Antimonumenta does not commemorate a specific cause, but rather the lack of justice in cases of violence against women in the country. It is made of steel, it is painted purple and depicts the Venus symbol with a raised fist at its center. The structure measures 1.6 m (5 ft 3 in) in height and stands on a concrete base, which bears four slogans, one inscribed on each face: Por las madres víctimas de feminicidio ("For the mothers victims of femicide"), Todas somos una ("All [women] are one"), Cambiando la historia juntas ("Changing history together") and Ni una menos ("Not one less").

== Demonstrations at the Antimonumenta ==
On 20 January 2022, the Antimonumenta served as the meeting point for a demonstration by activists protesting the online circulation of intimate images of a woman when she was a minor. In 2023, two mobilizations were held in connection with the International Women's Day; one of them ended at the Antimonumenta. In 2025, activists installed a clothesline to denounce child support debtors.
