= Antimonumento +65 =

Anti-monument in Mexico City

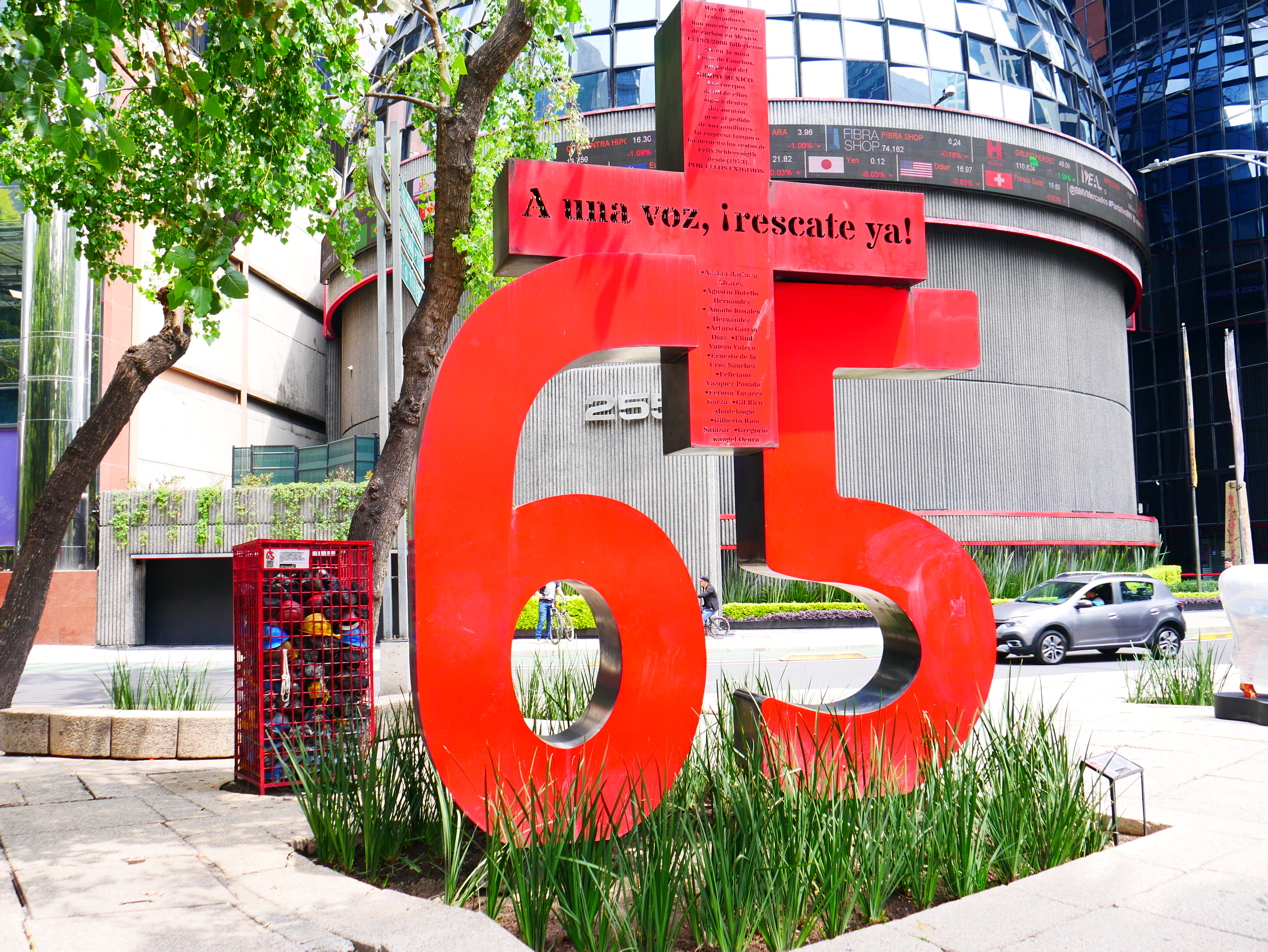
- The anti-monument in 2023
- Location
- Location: Mexico City, Mexico
- Coordinates: 19°25′44″N 99°09′51″W
- Designer: Anonymous demonstrators
- Type: Antimonumento
- Material: Steel, hard hats and coal
- Height: 4.5 m (15 ft)
- Weight: 1 t (0.98 long tons; 1.1 short tons)
- Opening date: 18 February 2018
- Dedicated to: The victims of the 2006 Pasta de Conchos mine disaster

Antimonumento +65 is an antimonumento (anti-monument) near the Mexican Stock Exchange, on Paseo de la Reforma, in the borough of Cuauhtémoc in Mexico City. The installation features the number 65 and a plus sign, commemorating the sixty-five miners who died in the Pasta de Conchos mine disaster on 19 February 2006 in San Juan de Sabinas Municipality, Coahuila. Only two bodies had been recovered as of 2018.

The anti-monument was installed on 18 February 2018, the eve of the disaster's twelfth anniversary, as a demand for justice in response to the collapse and government inaction. The installation was not given an official name; organizers simply referred to it as Antimonumento.

The plus symbol in the sculpture is engraved with the names of the victims and the Spanish phrase A una voz, ¡rescate ya! (transl. 'With one voice, rescue now!'). The symbol also represents miners who died in similar incidents. The following year, activists placed a metal cage behind the sculpture containing sixty-three helmets buried in coal extracted from a Coahuila mine.

== Background ==
Pasta de Conchos was a coal mine in Nueva Rosita, San Juan de Sabinas Municipality, Coahuila. The land is owned by the Mexican conglomerate Grupo México. On 19 February 2006, approximately at 2:00 a.m. CST (UTC−6), a methane explosion occurred inside the mine, trapping sixty-five miners.. The company reported that each miner had up to six hours of oxygen to reach a tunnel ventilation system. To prevent additional explosions, rescuers refrained from using electric or gas-powered equipment and instead employed tools such as picks and shovels. No monitoring system was in place to accurately locate the workers, whose position was estimated to be somewhere within a tunnel between 490 meters (1,610 ft) and 5 kilometers (3.1 mi) from the exit, at a depth of 150 meters (490 ft).

Five days later, Grupo México suspended rescue operations and declared that the miners had allegedly died, stating that "there was no possibility of survival after the methane explosion". Before the disaster, there had been multiple reports of methane leaks inside the mine. On 23 June 2006, the body of Felipe de Jesús Torres Reyna was recovered, followed by the recovery of José Manuel Peña Saucedo on 1 January 2007. Subsequently, Grupo México halted further recovery efforts, citing sanitation and safety concerns. According to a study by the non-governmental organization Poder, Grupo México submitted three technical documents containing irregularities requesting authorities to suspend the rescue operation. Two of the reports presented contradictory data on the volume of water inside the tunnels, estimating it to be between 25% and 75%, and it is also claimed that the water could be contaminated with diseases such as hepatitis, tuberculosis, and HIV (Note: HIV cannot be transmitted through water) due to the decomposition of the bodies.

== History and installation ==
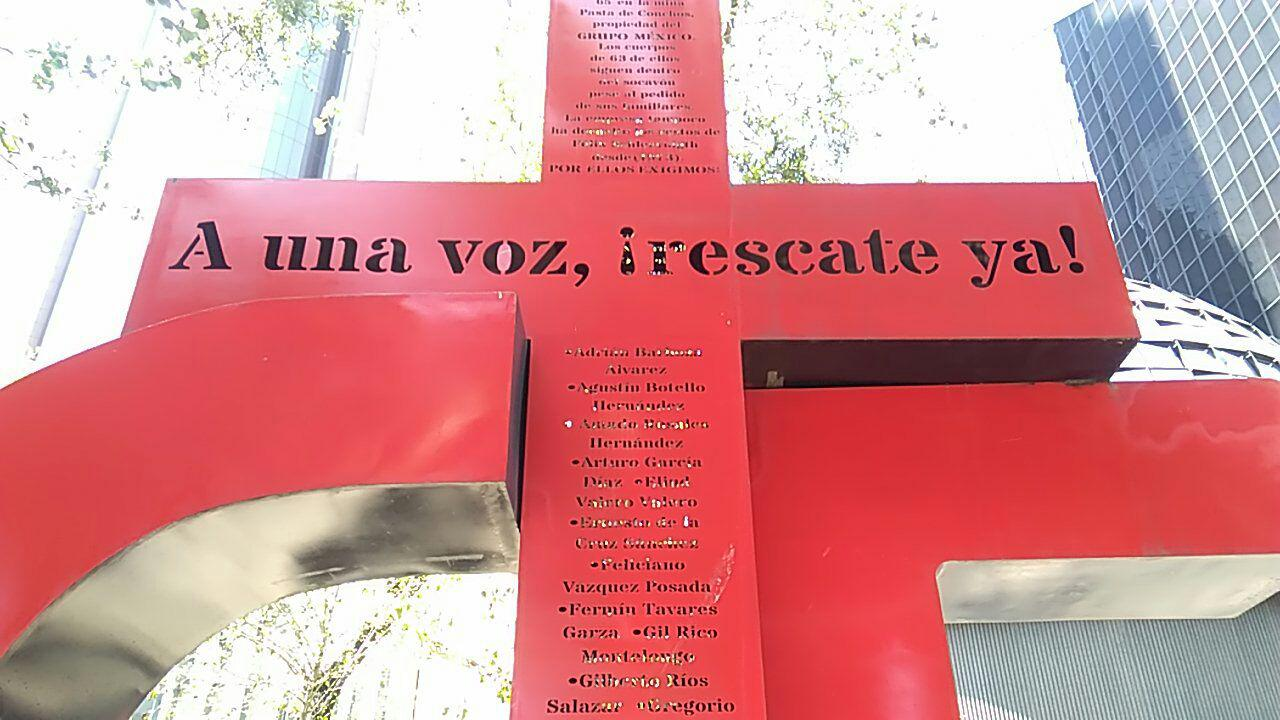
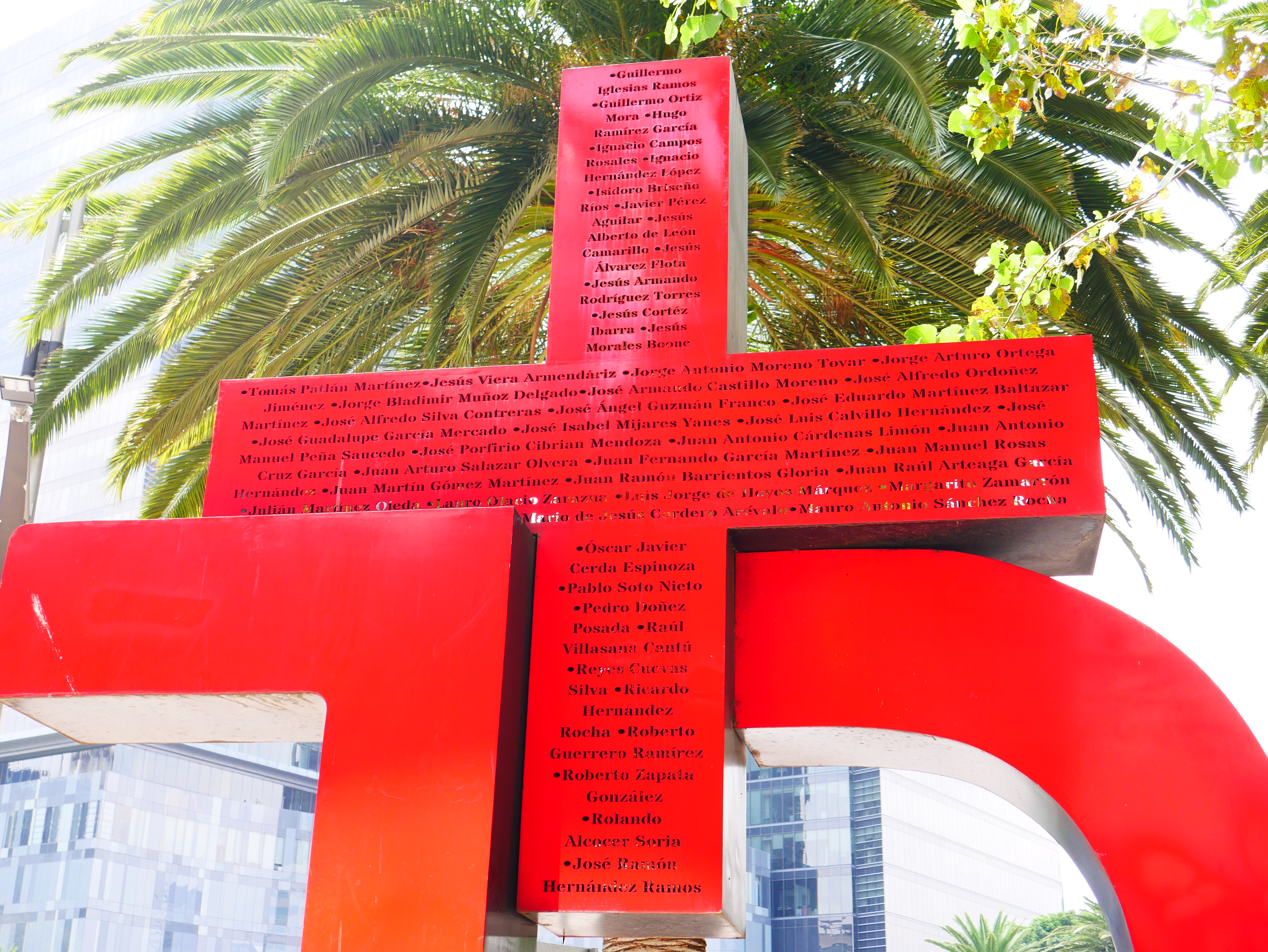
The front (top) and back (bottom) of the plus sign listing the names of the miners

Several relatives of the victims formed the organization Familia Pasta de Conchos. The group has repeatedly claimed that Grupo México distorted the events surrounding the disaster. Following the 2010 Copiapó mining accident in Chile, the organization sent a letter congratulating the families of the thirty-three rescued miners. In it, they stated: "Grupo México and the federal and state governments lied to us. They told us there had been a massive explosion, that the miners had died and even disintegrated. The truth has come to light: the two bodies that were recovered were intact, not even burned".

On the afternoon of 18 February 2018, the eve of the twelfth anniversary of the disaster, relatives of the deceased miners protested in Mexico City. The demonstration began at the Benito Juárez Hemicycle and proceeded toward Paseo de la Reforma. In previous years, they had carried on their shoulders sixty-five coffins symbolizing the victims. On this occasion, approximately 200 people, including four priests, marched toward the Angel of Independence column and stopped at the Glorieta de la Palma traffic circle, near the Mexican Stock Exchange Building. A truck parked on the avenue unloaded three red steel structures: the numbers six and five, and a plus sign. There, the names of the miners were read aloud, along with that of Félix Schleevoigth, who worked for Grupo México and died in a similar collapse in 1973, and whose body was never recovered. Bishop Raúl Vera and Father Miguel Concha presided over a mass.

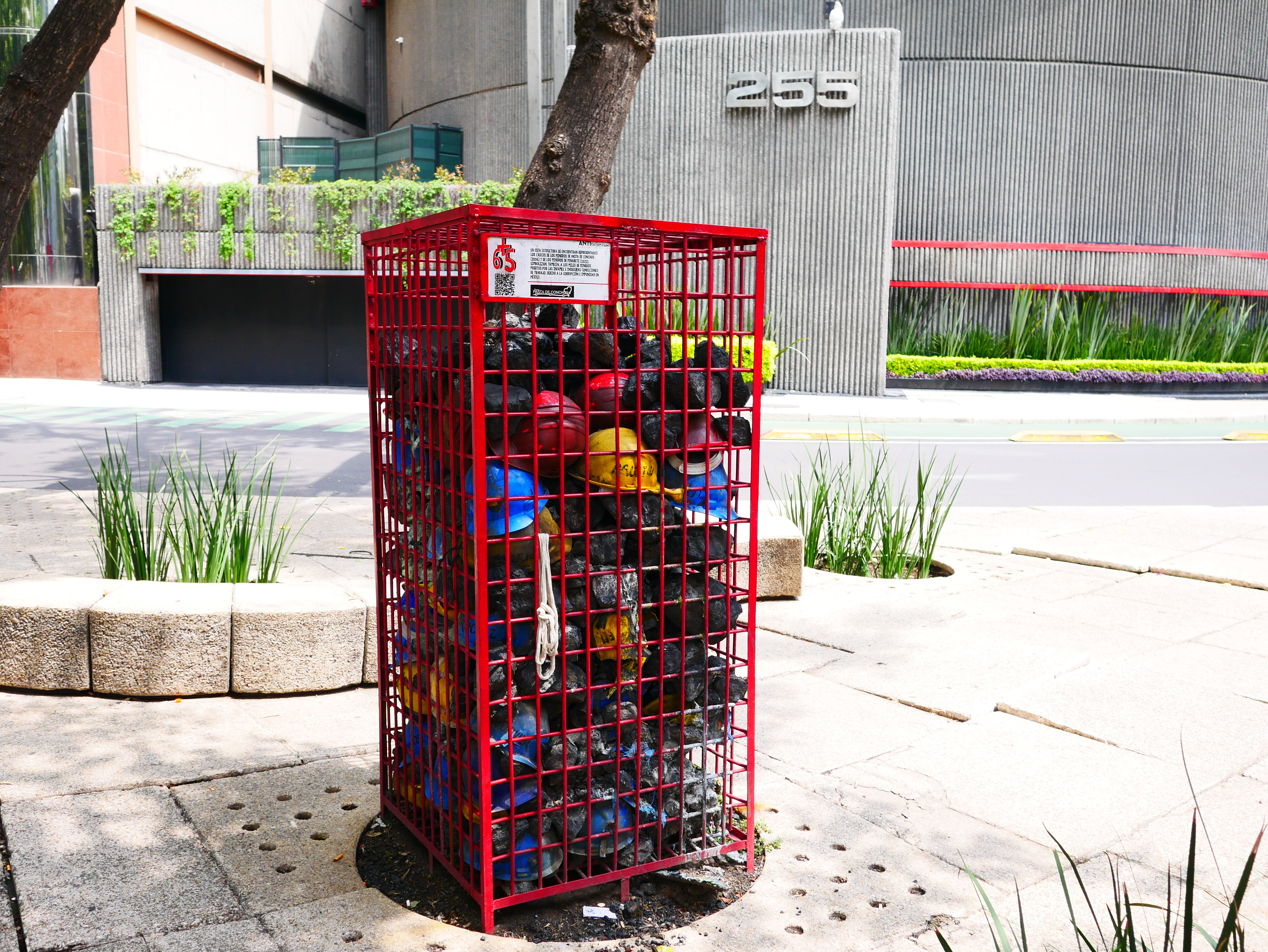
The cage is filled with hard hats and coal

The structures were assembled on a traffic median along the avenue, where they were fitted, screwed in, welded, and set in foundations filled with cement. It stands 4.5 meters (15 ft) tall and weighs over 1 metric ton (0.98 long tons; 1.1 short tons). The plus sign bears the inscription "A una voz, ¡rescate ya!" (Spanish for "With one voice, rescue now!") engraved in its center, while the names of the sixty-five miners and Félix Schleevoigth are inscribed on both the front and back. Guillermo Iglesias, the son of one of the miners, stated that it also serves as a cross, one "they have carried for a long time". The anti-monument is additionally dedicated to all miners who have died under similar circumstances. According to the report El carbón rojo de Coahuila: Aquí se termina el silencio (2018), written by Elvira Martínez Espinoza and published by the Heinrich Böll Foundation, 3,103 miners have died in collapses and explosions since 1900 in Mexico. The report further asserts that at Grupo México mines, the bodies of deceased workers are only recovered when it is considered viable to continue mineral extraction.

The location was chosen because of its proximity to the Mexican Stock Exchange Building, where Grupo México is publicly traded. During the mass held at the installation, Bishop Vera said that "[businesspeople], like Satan in the Gospel, seek the destruction of life, the land, the human being, and the social fabric in the coal mining region of Coahuila". He also criticized political figures, saying that they "hate the people" and "are killing the country".

The following year, on 19 February 2019, the organization installed a red metal cage measuring 2-meter (6 ft 7 in) in height. The structure was filled with coal and buried sixty-three hard hats of various colors, each labeled with the name of one of the miners. The coal was sourced from a Coahuila mine and carried by relatives of the victims. According to the demonstrators, each helmet would be removed if the corresponding body was ever recovered. In 2022, the cage was vandalized, with several helmets showed signs of fire damage.
