= Antimonumenta (Mexico City) =

Anti-monument in Mexico City

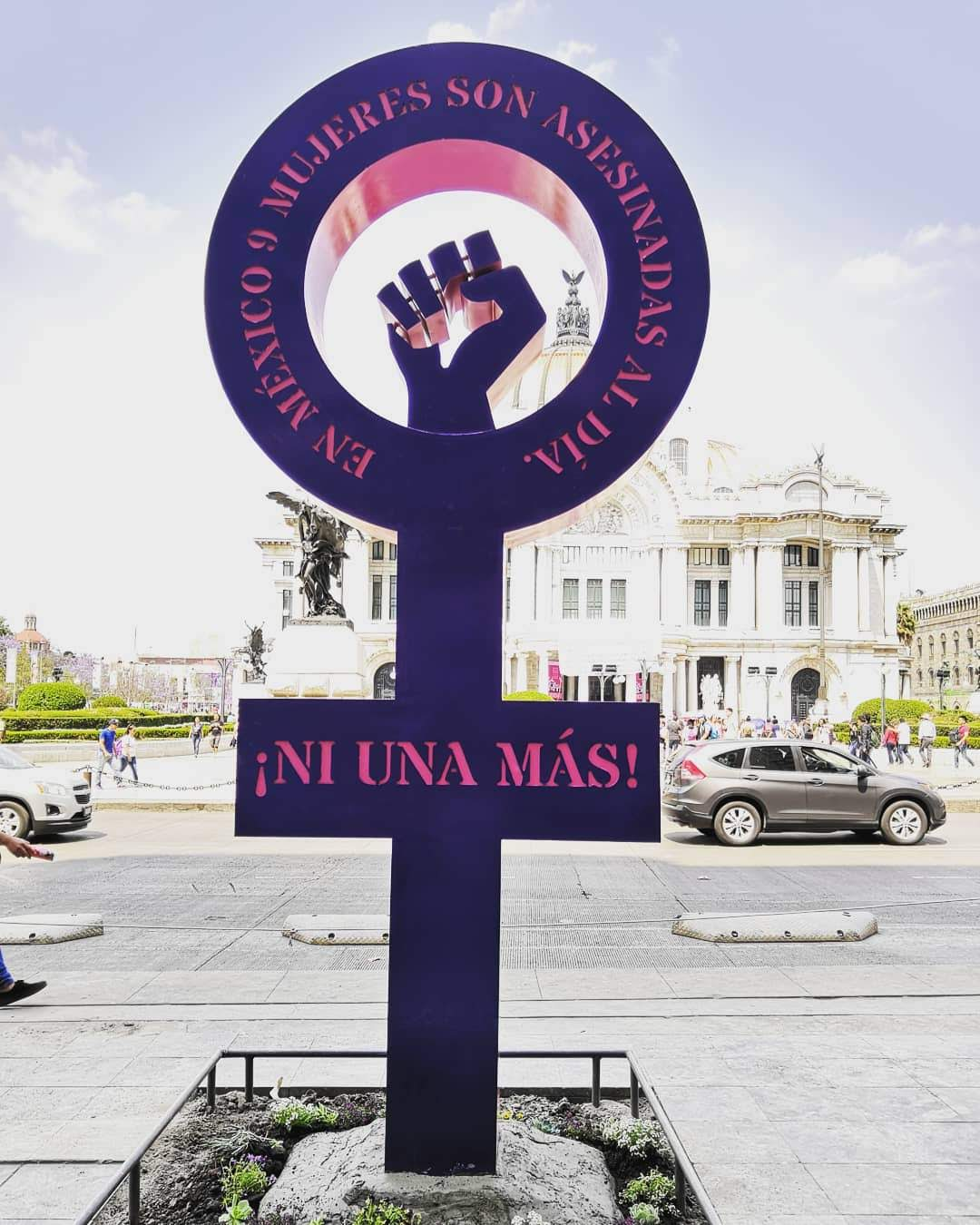
- The anti-monument the day after it was installed
- Location
- Location: Mexico City, Mexico
- Coordinates: 19°26′3.1″N 99°8′29.3″W
- Designer: Feminists
- Type: Antimonumenta
- Material: Metal
- Opening date: 8 March 2019
- Dedicated to: Violence against women in Mexico

An antimonumenta was installed in front of the Palace of Fine Arts, in Mexico City on 8 March 2019, the date commemorating International Women's Day, during the annual march of women protesting against gender violence.

The sculpture was symbolically named Antimonumenta and has since inspired similar anti-monuments throughout the country, including the one in Guadalajara, Jalisco and the one in Morelia, Michoacán. The erection of an antimonumenta symbolizes the demand for justice for women who suffer from violence in the country.

== History and installation ==
The Antimonumenta was erected on 8 March 2019 on Juárez Avenue, in front of the Palace of Fine Arts in Mexico City during the annual International Women's Day march of women protesting against gender violence. The installation of the structure lasted more than two hours, and it was paid for by relatives of victims of femicide, feminist collectives and civil society organizations.

According to the activists:

"This anti-monument is to remind us that there is still no justice for women in Mexico, that we continue disappearing and that we continue being killed. We will not remain silent". (Note: Original text in Spanish: "Este antimonumento es para recordar que sigue sin haber justicia para las mujeres en México, que seguimos desapareciendo y que nos siguen matando. No nos vamos a callar".)

After its installation, group members organized a sit-in around the Antimonumenta during the following days, to guarantee its protection and prevent its removal by the city's police.

Days later, women's collectives against femicide and violence launched a petition on Change.org addressed to the president of the country, Andrés Manuel López Obrador, the mayor of the city, Claudia Sheinbaum, the Office in Mexico of the United Nations High Commissioner for Human Rights (UN-HCHR); and UN Women Mexico, so that the Antimonumenta would not be removed.

On 8 March 2020, the women's march began at the Monument to the Revolution and ended at the Antimonumenta, where a list of names of victims of femicide was read, and silence was observed for them. On the night of 24 November 2020, during the eve of the International Day for the Elimination of Violence against Women, relatives of victims of femicide gathered and demonstrated at the Antimonumenta, closing Juárez Avenue for approximately one hour.

== Description and meaning ==
The Antimonumenta is painted in purple and pink and it is represented with the symbol of the feminist struggle, which is based on the symbol of Venus with a raised fist in the center. In feminism, the color purple represents "loyalty, constancy towards a purpose [and] unwavering firmness towards a cause". According to the installers, it represents the victims of femicide in the country and symbolizes the injustices and inactions committed by the authorities.

It is a metal sculpture whose upper part has written in Spanish, in pink capital letters: "In Mexico 9 women are murdered daily", while on the arm of the cross it is written "Not one more!". On the opposite side, the Antimonumenta reads "We demand a national gender alert", and in the central part "No + Femicides".

Writer Francesca Gargallo said that it "challenges everyone, because women are half of any society or people, and when half of the people is affected, half of the people can say enough is enough and demand [for justice]".

== See also ==
- Glorieta de las mujeres que luchan, another antimonumenta in the city.
