= Pasta de Conchos mine disaster =

2006 methane explosion in Coahuila, Mexico

- Date: 19–25 February 2006 (6 days)
- Time: 14:05 CST
- Location: San Juan de Sabinas, Coahuila, Mexico; 27°58′03″N 101°19′39″W

A methane explosion occurred at approximately 2:30 a.m. CST on February 19, 2006, in the Pasta de Conchos coal mine near Nueva Rosita, San Juan de Sabinas Municipality, in the Mexican state of Coahuila. The mines were run by Grupo México, the largest mining company in the country. It was estimated that 65 miners, who were working the 10 p.m. to 6 a.m. shift that morning, were trapped underground by the explosion. As of February 2026, 27 of the 65 bodies have been recovered.

== Background ==
There have been conflicting reports regarding the depth at which the miners were trapped. The National Mining and Metal Workers Union (SNTMMSRM) stated that the trapped miners were approximately 500 metres (1,600 ft) below ground, via a 1,500 m (5,000 ft) horizontal tunnel. Grupo México released a statement saying that the miners were about 150 metres (500 ft) below ground when the explosion occurred. Guadalupe Rosales Martínez, the sister of a worker saved from the mine opening, told the Los Angeles Times that the workers had previously complained about a gas leak in the mine. Norma Vitela, the wife of a mine worker trapped inside the mine, told The Miami Herald that her husband complained about the same leak.

== Explosion ==
When the gas explosion occurred, the temperature inside the mine dramatically increased to 1,100 °F (600 °C), releasing methane and carbon monoxide that would have absorbed nearly all available oxygen.

== Rescue efforts ==
By February 21, 2006, Grupo México search teams and relatives of the trapped miners were beginning to lose hope. Each miner was allotted an oxygen pack, but the pack guaranteed the miners only six hours of oxygen. The Governor of Coahuila, Humberto Moreira Valdés, told the Televisa television network that the mine's ventilation service, which uses fans to import oxygen and export dangerous gases, was still in operation. However, the February 21 edition of The Miami Herald remarked, "Even so, they could not be certain the oxygen was arriving at the miners location." Rescue crews managed to get through a wall of debris before encountering another 500-metre (1,800 ft) wall inside the tunnel, where it was believed that at least two conveyor belt operators may have been trapped. Most of the other trapped miners were believed to be between 1,600 and 4,800 metres (1 and 3 mi) from the entrance of the mine.

It was reported that mine workers had gone on strike against Grupo México at least 14 times, "not only for salary increases… but because of its constant refusal to review security and health measures." Grupo México said that they, in conjunction with the mining union, signed a certificate on February 7, 2006, declaring the mine safe.

On February 23, 2006, Grupo México advanced to a part of the tunnel where they believed 2 of the 65 workers were trapped. However, they found nobody, leading them to believe the force of the explosion knocked them through the tunnel deeper than they had anticipated. The next day, Grupo México advanced approximately halfway into the 2,820-metre (1.75 mi) long mine, where an additional twenty-four miners were expected to have been found. Again, nobody was found, and Grupo México hypothesized that either the miners were buried under debris or the miners were located in a deeper part of the mine. On the evening of February 24, Grupo México announced that search efforts were to be suspended for two or three days, due to search teams advancing to a portion of the mine with high levels of natural gas. On the afternoon of February 25 the CEO of Grupo México confirmed during a press conference that "there was no possibility of survival after the methane explosion", based on a scientific report. The following day the Secretary of Labor, Francisco Javier Salazar Sáenz, and Governor Moreira announced the mine would be closed indefinitely once all the bodies were recovered.

The Diario newspaper of Ciudad Juárez reported that Mexican scientists working with experts from the U.S. Mine Safety and Health Administration stated that, due to the high levels of toxic gas in the mine, it was impossible that anyone had survived.

== Aftermath ==
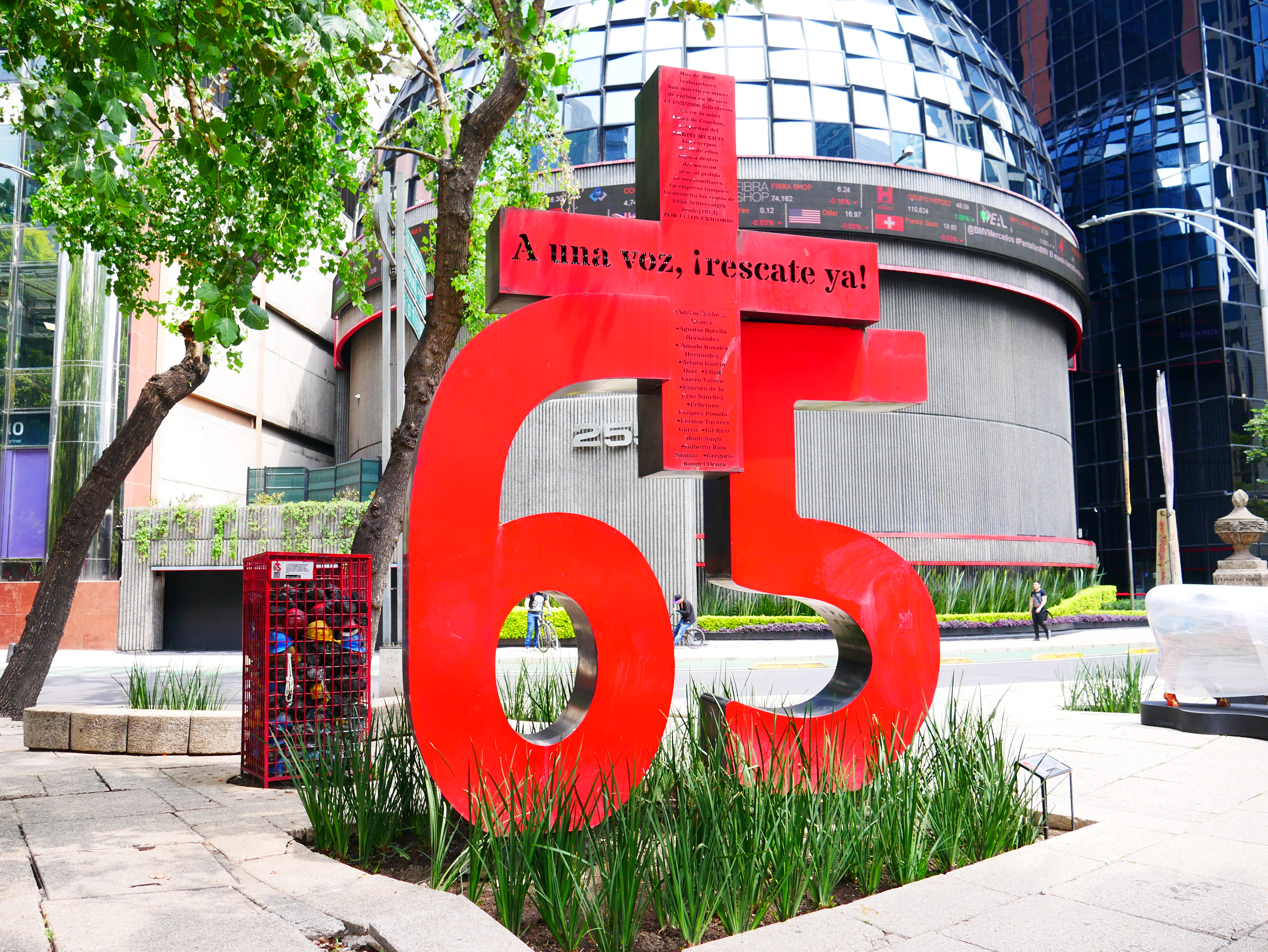
Antimonumento +65, a memorial set to honor the victims

After the rescue of 33 trapped miners in October 2010 in Copiapó, Chile, bishop Raúl Vera demanded that the case be reopened.

According to the IndustriALL Global Union, as of August 2016, "Ten years after the mining homicide at Pasta de Conchos, Mexico, the government has still not conducted a thorough investigation into the real causes of the disaster, brought those responsible to justice, recovered the bodies or compensated the families of the victims."

=== Recovery operation ===
On February 18, 2020, Mexico's government announced it would resume the search for 63 bodies still lost in the accident. Grupo México insisted they voluntarily returned the concession to the government. Families of the victims say the company did not conduct a thorough search because they did not want the deplorable working conditions revealed; company officials insist it is too dangerous to carry out the rescue operation. In 2018 the Inter-American Commission on Human Rights agreed with the families. President Andrés Manuel López Obrador promised in 2019 that he would recover the bodies.

The government and family members reached an agreement on September 14, 2020. The bodies of the miners would be rescued, a memorial will be built, and the 65 families will be compensated by the end of the year. The estimated US$75 million cost will be financed by the CFE through sale of the coal from the mine. López Obrador announced on February 19, 2021, the 15th anniversary of the accident, that rescue efforts had begun. He expressed hope that the rescue effort would be completed by the end of his term in office. On June 12, 2024, authorities announced the discovery of some of the bodies inside the mine.
