= Cruz de Clavos =

Feminist memorial in Chihuahua, Mexico

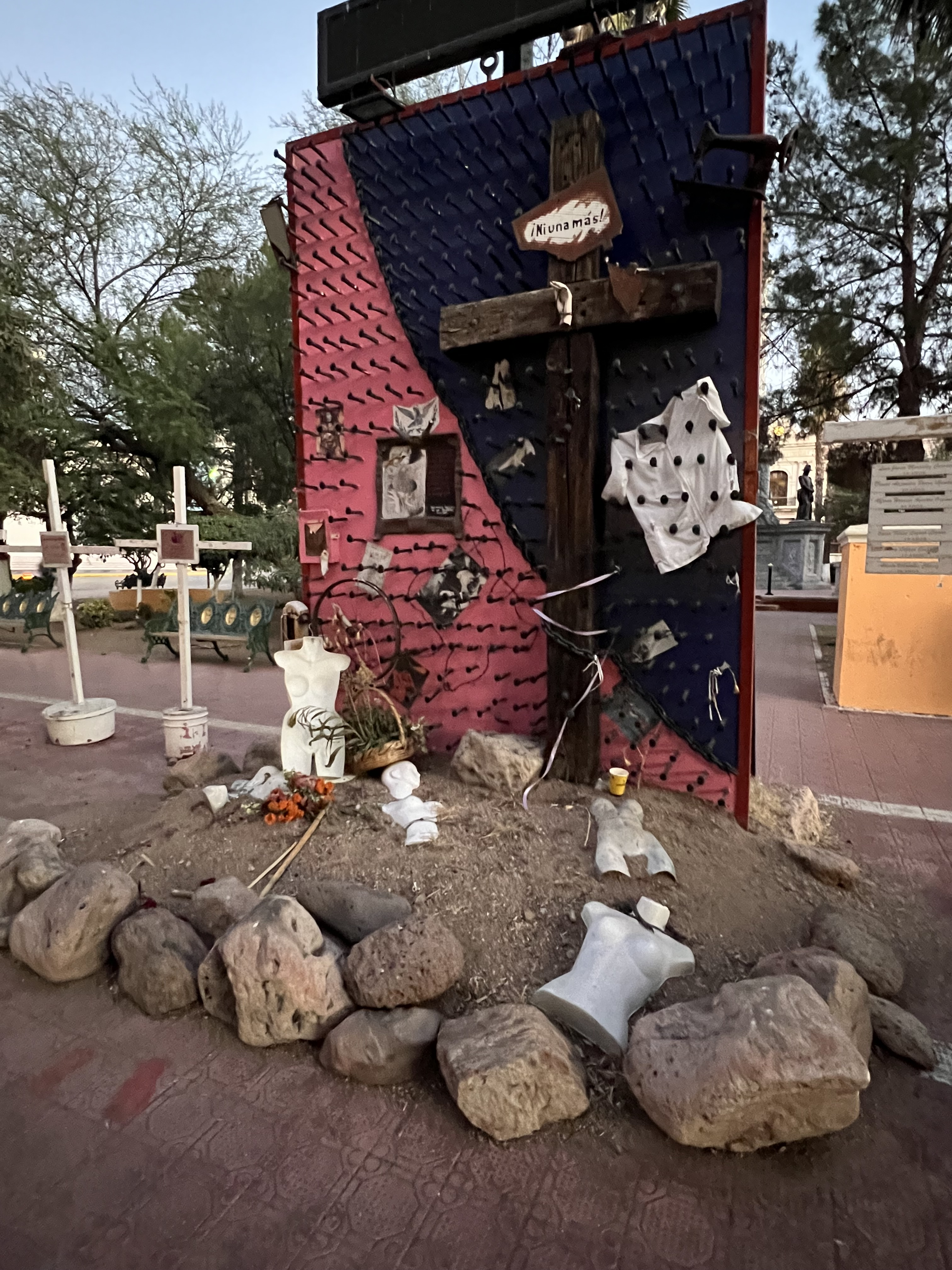
- The Chihuahua City cross in 2024
- Location in Chihuahua City
- Location: Chihuahua City and Ciudad Juárez, Chihuahua, Mexico
- Coordinates: 28°38′20″N 106°04′23″W
- Designer: 8 de Marzo feminist group (proposal); Exworkers of Aceros de Chihuahua (work)
- Material: Steel, wood and nails
- Width: 2.5 m (8 ft 2 in) (replica)
- Height: 3.7 m (12 ft) (replica); approx. 2 m (6 ft 7 in) (Juárez)
- Weight: 1.5 t (1.5 long tons; 1.7 short tons) (replica)
- Opening date: 25 November 2001; 24 years ago (original); August 2003; 23 years ago (replica)
- Dedicated to: Victims of femicide
- Dismantled date: 22 June 2002; 24 years ago (original)

The Cruz de Clavos (transl. "Cross of Nails") is a memorial honoring victims of femicide in the Mexican state of Chihuahua. One copy is located in front of the Government Palace of Chihuahua in the capital city and a replica is located in Ciudad Juárez.

The artwork has a Christian cross covered in and surrounded by nails, each representing murdered women whose cases remain unresolved. It was installed on 25 November 2001 – the International Day for the Elimination of Violence Against Women – by the feminist group 8 de Marzo, with the support of former workers of Aceros de Chihuahua (Achisa), who installed it in Plaza Hidalgo, Chihuahua City. Human rights activist Rosa Salazar has described it as a precursor to the Antimonumenta sculptures that emerged in the 2010s in the country, which function as memorials to victims of femicide.

The original Cruz de Clavos sculpture contained 260 nails. The state government rejected its installation, and months later it was reported stolen. In August 2003, collectives installed a larger replica at the same location. Another version was erected at the El Paso PDN Port of Entry, in Juárez in March 2002. Both have served as focal points for various mobilizations, particularly for the women's movement and for mothers whose children have disappeared or been killed in Chihuahua.

== Background ==
Beginning in 1993, more reports of murdered women appeared than usual in the Mexican state of Chihuahua, particularly in the border city of Ciudad Juárez, which lies along the Mexico–United States border across from El Paso, Texas. According to Melissa M. Wright, between the 1994 implementation of the North American Free Trade Agreement (NAFTA) and 2001, the homicide rate rose by 300 percent for men and by 600 percent for women.

In November 2001, the bodies of multiple tortured and raped women were found in a cotton field. In a landmark case, the Inter-American Court of Human Rights ruled that the Mexican government bore responsibility for its lack of due diligence in the case, which set a precedent for the classification of femicide as a specific offense in the Mexican Penal Code.

As of 2022, 2,376 women had been killed and 282 reported disappeared in Juárez.

== History and installation ==
Due to what activists and human rights associations described as a lack of sustained action by state authorities to address the crisis in Chihuahua, several individuals organized demonstrations to draw public attention to the issue. The feminist collective 8 de Marzo proposed a memorial's creation. The memorial was created with assistance from former workers of the steel company Aceros de Chihuahua (Achisa). It was installed in front of the Government Palace of Chihuahua, in Chihuahua City, on 25 November 2001 – the International Day for the Elimination of Violence Against Women. It had 260 nails measuring approximately 20 centimeters (7.9 in) each, representing the total number of femicides as of that year.

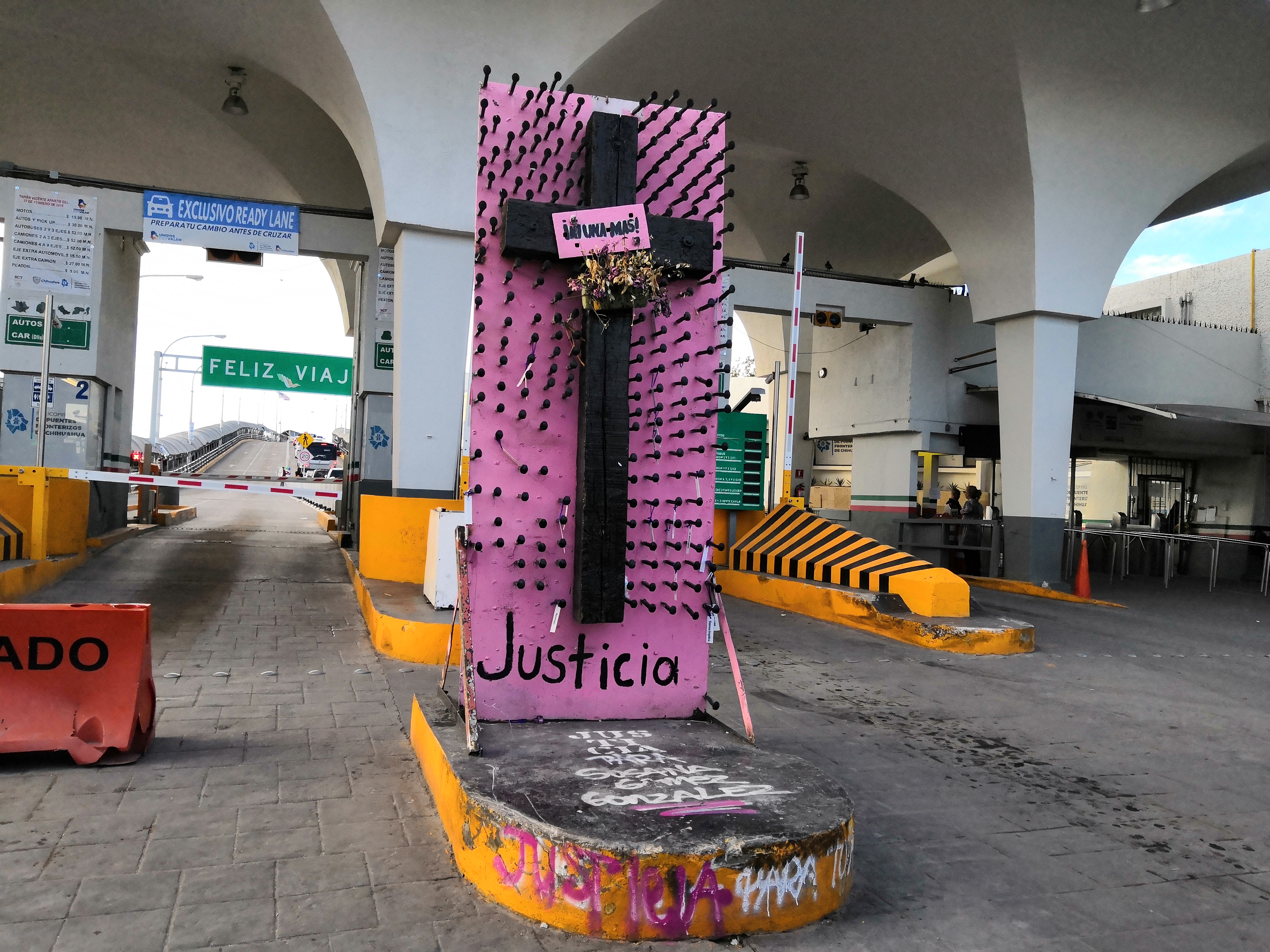
The Ciudad Juárez cross in 2019

Months later, on 8 March 2002 – International Women's Day – multiple non-governmental organization created the Éxodo por la vida march, in which participants walked approximately 45 kilometers (28 mi) from Chihuahua City to Ciudad Juárez, arriving on 13 March. There, they installed a replica more than 2-meter (6 ft 7 in) tall at the El Paso PDN Port of Entry. It featured a cross with 269 nails in memory of women murdered between 1993 and 2001. The day before the installation, organizers were informed that the original Cruz de Clavos had been the target of an attempted arson attack. It honors the women found in the cotton field, it bears the phrase "Ni una más" ("Not one [woman] more]") and its cross is black against a pink background.

On 22 June 2002, the original Cruz de Clavos in Chihuahua City was stolen. Although it had been embedded in the ground, the guards stationed in the area reported that they had not seen anything. Collectives attributed the act to workers linked to Governor Patricio Martínez García. Three days later, women protesting the removal were attacked.

The next month, on 16 July, while the Achisa ex-workers were crafting a replacement, an armed group broke into the premises and stole it. The keepers were beat, threatened, and gagged.

The latest version of the Cruz de Clavos is larger than the previous ones. It is 3.7 meters (12 ft) high, 2.5 meters (8 ft 2 in) wide, and weighs around 1.5 metric tons (1.5 long tons; 1.7 short tons). It was installed in August 2003, and the installation incorporated tools commonly used by women employed in maquiladoras, broken mannequins symbolizing assaulted women, women's clothing, and excerpts from the Universal Declaration of Human Rights. It also includes a picture of the Guernica by Pablo Picasso, which features a women grieving her baby's death, a photogram of the film Los Olvidados, and a photograph of El Grito by Francisco Toledo.

In 2010, Irma Campos Madrigal, a lawyer and co-founder of the 8 de Marzo group, publicly thanked the former Achisa workers who assisted with the installation. Since its installation, human rights groups and women have used the Cruz de Clavos installations as sites for protest. Rosa Salazár, coordinator of the Human Rights, Communication, and ICT Laboratory, considers the Cruz de Clavos a precursor to the Antimonumenta, counter-monument memorials installed by feminists across the country to demand justice, and which surged in the late 2010s.
