= Memorial to Victims of Violence in Mexico =

Monument in Mexico City

- Memorial a las víctimas de violencia en México
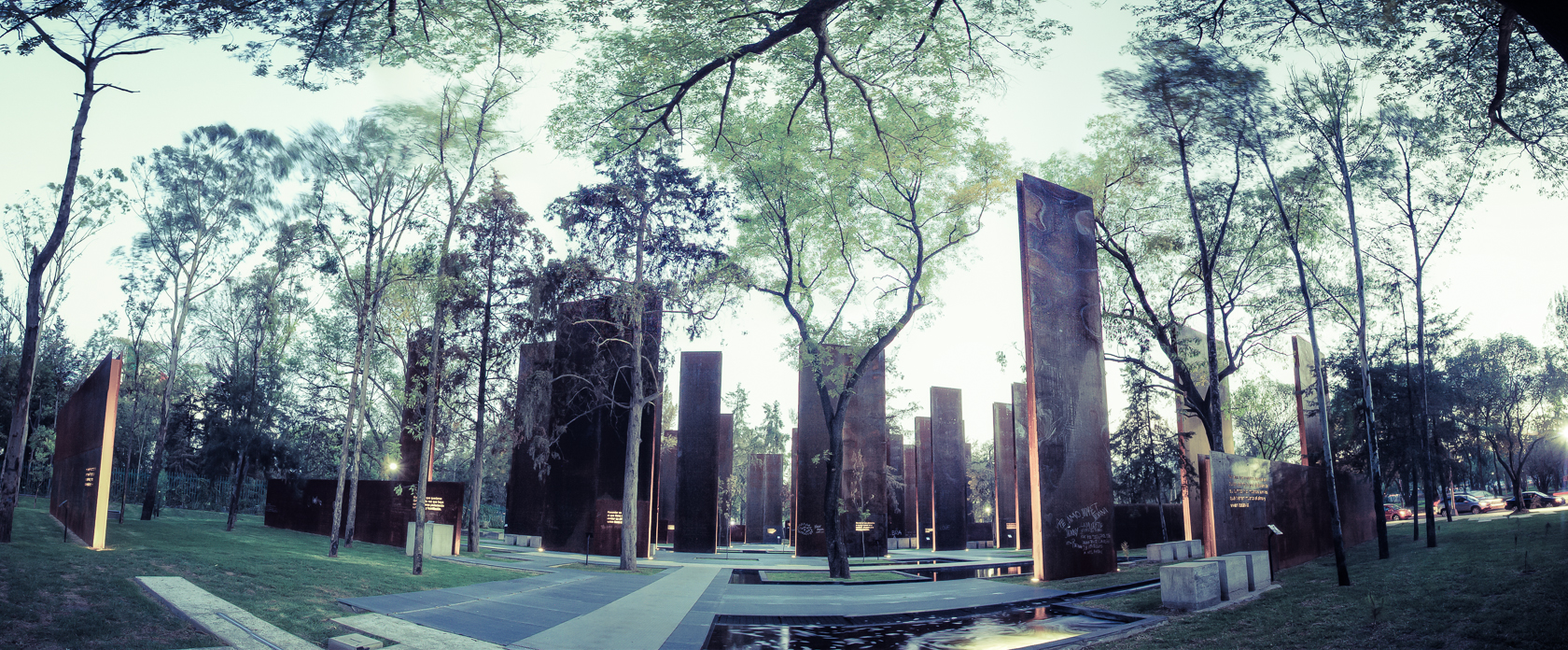
- The memorial in 2013
- Location
- Location: Mexico City, Mexico
- Coordinates: 19°25′30″N 99°11′57″W
- Designer: Julio Gaeta and Luby Springall (architects); Lighteam (illumination)
- Type: Memorial
- Material: Steel and concrete
- Width: 2.4 m (8 ft) (some walls)
- Height: 12 m (39 ft) (tallest point)
- Beginning date: 7 September 2012
- Completion date: 23 November 2012
- Opening date: 5 April 2013
- Dedicated to: Victims of violence in Mexico
- Website: gaeta-springall.com

The Memorial to Victims of Violence in Mexico (Spanish: Memorial a las víctimas de violencia en México), also referred to as the State Violence Victims Memorial (Spanish: Memorial de las víctimas de la violencia del Estado), is a memorial in Chapultepec, Mexico City. Its construction started in 2012 during the presidency of Felipe Calderón and it was opened to public on 5 April 2013, during Enrique Peña Nieto's administration. As its name suggests, it was created to pay tribute to those who have been victims of violence in the nation.

The memorial consists of 70 steel walls with varying textures, formerly illuminated by numerous reflectors that projected light from different angles – some originally installed underwater. The architectural design was led by Julio Gaeta and Luby Springall through their firm, Gaeta Springall Arquitectos, while lighting was handled by the company Lighteam. The creators described their work as an incomplete and unfinished project, intended for citizens to add the names of victims. Approximately 40 quotes from historical figures on violence and memory are also inscribed on the walls.

The project was well-received by architecture and art publications, and it won the Best Use of Color Award at the 2014 AL Light & Architecture Design Awards. However, it received polarized comments from human rights groups and society due to two factors. The first was the involvement of Calderón in the project as he started the Mexican drug war in 2006. The second was its location at Campo Marte, a venue operated by the Secretariat of National Defense, an institution that some victims' relatives have accused of complicity in the violence. The city government stopped funding the memorial's maintenance in 2021, stating that it was not a priority.

== Background and history ==
Felipe Calderón served as president of Mexico from 1 December 2006 to 30 November 2012. Shortly after taking office, he deployed the Mexican Armed Forces as part of the global war on drugs. During his presidency, the low-intensity conflict resulted in an estimated 70,000 deaths (Note: Officially, from December 2006 to September 2011, 47,515 conflict-related deaths were reported. Reports do not include missing persons. After that date, Calderón's government stopped publishing information related to the casualties.) in collateral damage, with Calderón saying that most of the fatalities were criminals.

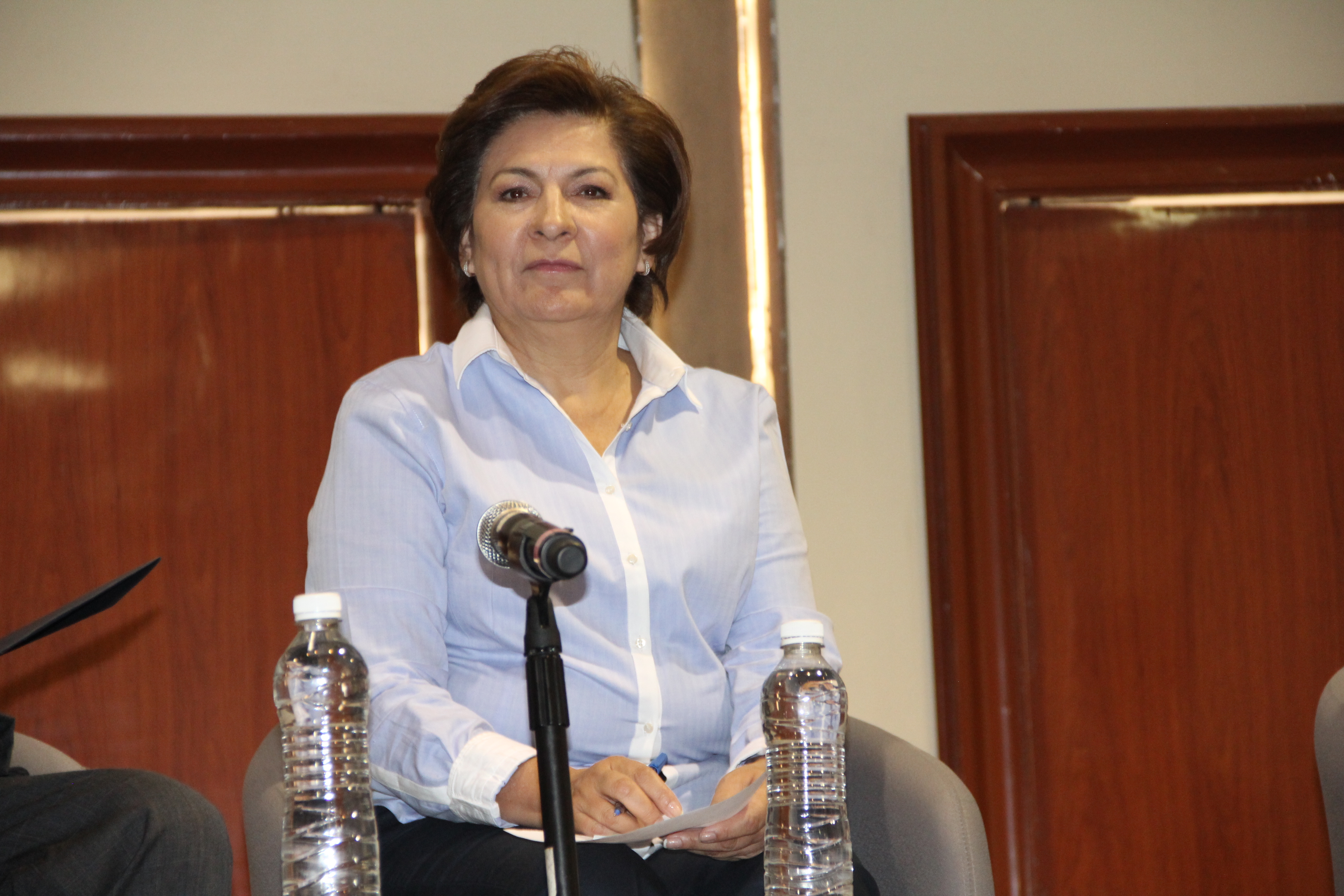
Isabel Miranda de Wallace asked for a location to erect a memorial.

Isabel Miranda de Wallace, founder of the organization Alto al Secuestro, asked Calderón in 2010 to designate a location for a memorial. Although the proposal was initially overlooked, Javier Sicilia, leader of the Movement for Peace with Justice and Dignity (MPJD), and activist Julián LeBarón reproposed it in a meeting with Calderón the following year. In 2012, Calderón spoke with victims' relatives and shared his intention to move forward with the construction of the memorial.

Gaeta Springall Arquitectos, led by Julio Gaeta and Luby Springall, won the national contest to design the memorial. The project was commissioned by the government agency Procuraduría Social de Atención a las Víctimas de Delitos (Províctima), which was later renamed the Comisión Ejecutiva de Atención a Víctimas (CEAV). The selected space was a 15,000 m^{2} (161,000 square feet) field at Campo Marte, previously managed by the Secretariat of National Defense (SEDENA), in Chapultepec Park, Mexico City. The Secretariat of Welfare contributed around Mex$30,000,000 (US$2,550,000) toward the project's cost.

Before construction began, the architectural team marked the locations where the walls would be installed. They also consulted Gustavo Viles, owner and lighting designer at Lighteam, who advised them throughout the process. Construction began on 7 September 2012 and was completed by 23 November of the same year. Once the stelae were in place, several lighting manufacturers were invited to present their fixtures for the installation. On the final day of Calderón's presidency, Secretary of the Interior Alejandro Poiré Romero held a symbolic inauguration of the memorial. However, it did not open to the public until 5 April 2013 during the presidency of Enrique Peña Nieto, Calderón's successor.

== Description and meaning ==
Gaeta Springall Arquitectos on the memorial
"This memorial, like others, exposes the failures of a society and gives form to the enduring memory of pain. It is a memorial that embodies remembrance; a tribute to those who were victims and to their families. It is a construction that acts as an antidote to the destruction caused by violence. It stands as a witness in time to a broken past; a voice that reminds us each day of a pain we seek to overcome, but do not wish to forget so that it is never repeated. It is a project that translates memory into space—into a walkable, open, experiential space that transforms the absences of the disappeared into permanent presences in both space and time."

The Memorial to Victims of Violence in Mexico features 70 steel walls constructed from oxidized, natural, or stainless steel. Their surfaces vary in texture, appearing either rusted or reflective. According to Springall, stainless steel was chosen for its mirror-like quality, intended to reflect the viewer's image back at them, while oxidized steel symbolizes the scars left by time. The walls come in a variety of sizes and shapes, though the most typical ones are 2.4 meters (7 ft 10 in) wide and 12 meters (39 ft) high.

The paths and benches are made of concrete. Originally, a shallow pond surrounded the structures. Around 40 quotations from historical figures – including Cicero, Mahatma Gandhi, Martin Luther King Jr., and Carlos Fuentes – are engraved on the stelae, addressing themes like violence, memory, love, and pain. The site's facilities are accessible to people with disabilities as there are access ramps for wheelchairs and braille signage plates.

The light-emitting diode (LED) lighting system previously featured varying levels of color and intensity. Light sources were placed in multiple zones, including underwater and along the corridors. Warm tones predominated in the lower areas, while more subdued colors illuminated the higher sections. Several lamps highlighted the gold-inked phrases, trees, and walkways. Since the memorial is open 24 hours a day, lighting played a crucial role after dark, as it meant to contrast with the darkness and symbolizes hope and life, according to Springall.

The memorial, which allows citizens to inscribe names of victims, is described by the creators as a living and ongoing project. Springall explained that no names were initially listed because they were unfamiliar with any of them. The Memorial to the Murdered Jews of Europe in Berlin, Germany, served as inspiration for this memorial, while the graffiti on the Berlin Wall influenced the idea of allowing those who have lost loved ones to leave messages on the walls. The numbers seven and ten, symbolizing remembrance and religious perfection, respectively, led to the choice of the number 70 for the memorial.

== Reception ==
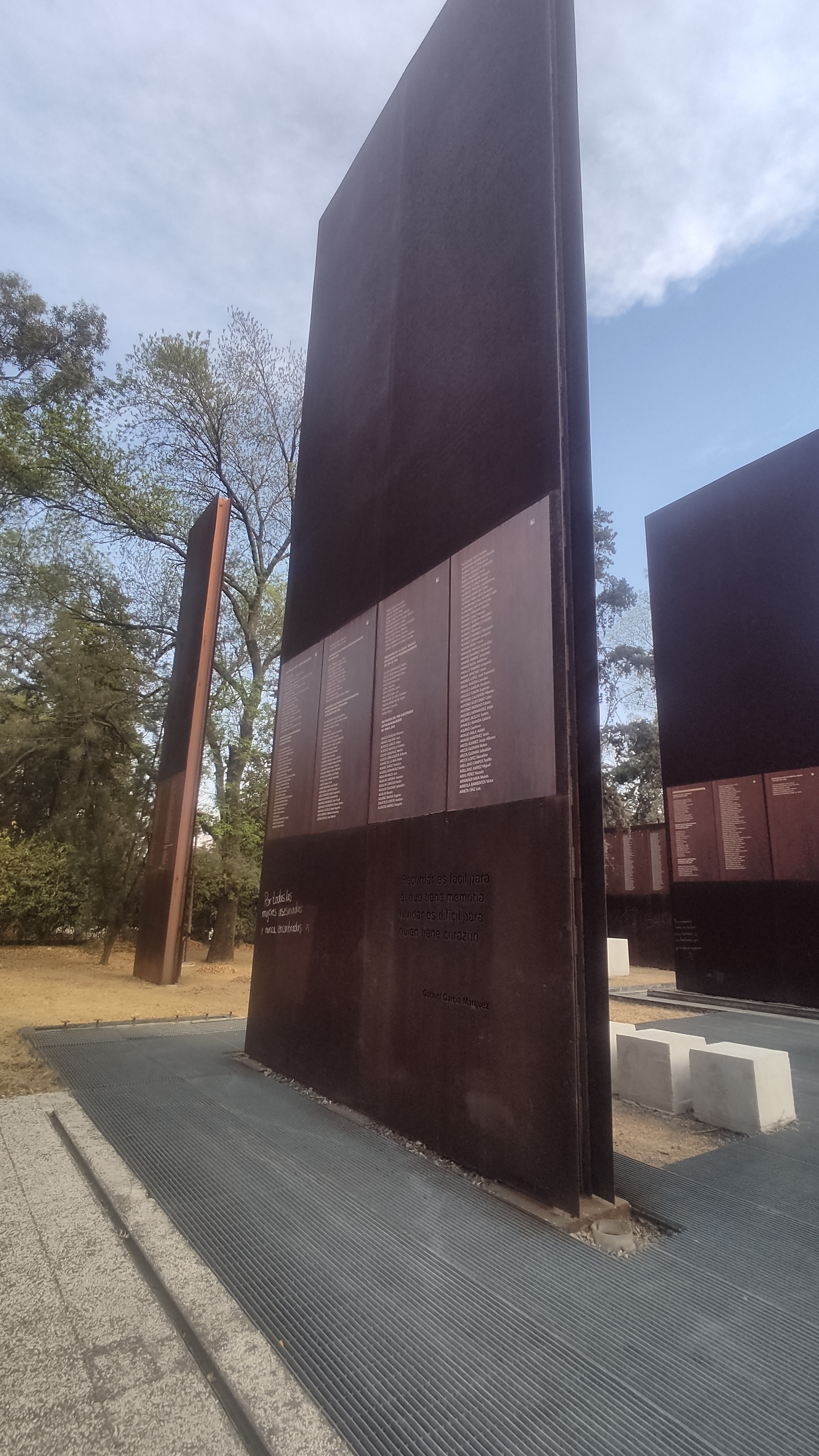
Many of the stelae have permanent plaques bearing the names of the victims of the multiple massacres committed in the country.

The memorial received the Best Use of Color Award at the 2014 AL Light & Architecture Design Awards. According to the jury, light conveys a message and subtly defines boundaries. For Elizabeth Donoff from Architect Magazine, the lighting communicate "an unspoken language of healing". Kristin Feireiss, architecture and design curator and Pritzker Architecture Prize juror, said the memorial mimics nature holistically and engages the community through its "strong physical presence, extraordinary artistic sensitivity and poetic dialogue". Samuel Cochran of Architectural Digest described the walls as calling "for remembrance and reflection", comparing them to the work of Richard Serra. Jesús Tovar of El Siglo de Torreón dubbed the memorial "simple, humble, sober, integrated and different". He praised how it uses lights and nature to fill empty spaces. The staff from Expansión gave it a honorific mention among the best works of the year, and Vice listed it as one of the Best in Architecture works in 2013.

Nevertheless, the project received criticism from human rights groups and society members, who objected to its location and its ambiguous dedication. Eduardo Vázquez from the MPJD called it an illegitimate monument that was erected in a military <one, arguing that it failed to properly honor the victims. He also dismissed it, saying its creation was driven solely by Calderón's will. In the book Museums and Sites of Persuasion, Benjamin Nienass and Alexandra Délano Alonso describe the monument as "a façade of participation" meant not to foster democratic legitimacy or open debate, but to shield decision-makers from accountability.

Members of the MPJD initially requested public hearings to determine the memorial's location and to compile a list of victims' names, but both requests were denied. Sicilia commented that it would be preferable to intervene the Estela de Luz as a "Center of Memory". He also likened the memorial to a mass grave. Architect Miquel Adrià predicted that the monument would be forgotten due to a lack of public engagement, saying that any memorial "only has value to the extent that it has a meaning".

The placement of it in a military facility was seen by the victims' families as a provocation, given the military's role in the conflict. María de Vecchi, member of the H.I.J.O.S. México organization, said that the project is nothing more than a government façade as long as crimes continue to go unpunished.

On the other hand, some organizations took a more optimistic view. Félix Hernández Guzmán of the Comité 68 group commented that, regardless of the memorial's location, the organization has placed numerous plaques there bearing the names of the Tlatelolco massacre victims. Initially, Miranda de Wallace supported the installation, viewing it as a space for reflection and forward-looking thinking. By 2015, however, she said its original purpose had been lost because it failed to raise awareness to the country's violence and the government had given the memorial no significance. Alejandro Martí of México SOS also attended the inauguration. There, he remarked that the memorial should represent a shared commitment to preventing future tragedies.

== Abandonment ==
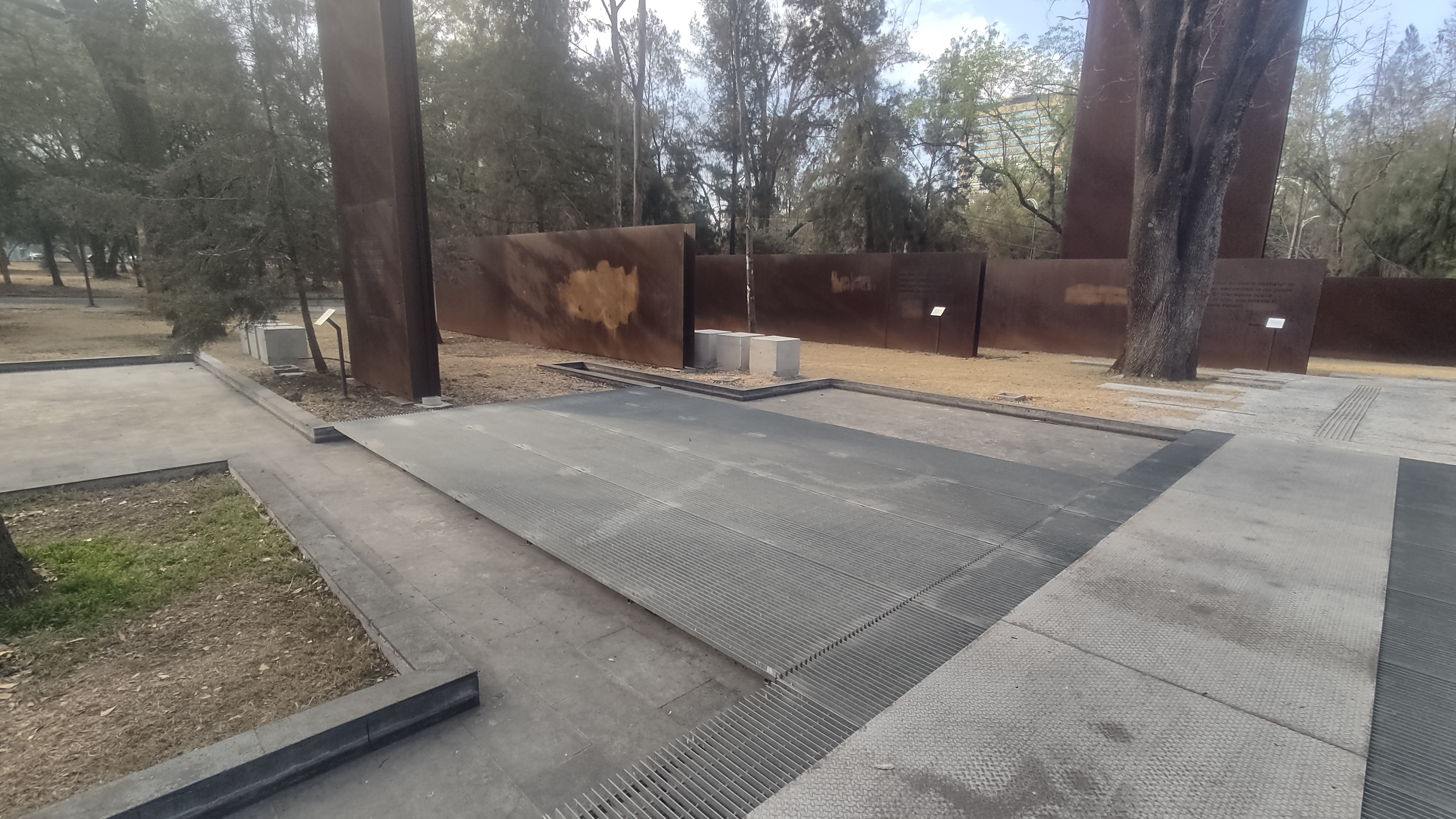
The memorial lacks water and lighting; some of the stelae have graffiti smudging as of 2023.

From 2018 to 2021, the memorial received only basic gardening maintenance, and since 2021, it has not received any public funding. In 2022, Reyna Paz Avendaño of La Crónica de Hoy reported that the original lighting was no longer in place, the pond water had become stagnant, several walls were graffitied or showed evidence of poor cleaning attempts, braille signage was damaged, and some panels commemorating victims had been removed.

== See also ==
- Anti-monuments in Mexico, memorial-like works installed by non-governmental groups
