= Antimonumento +43 =

Anti-monument in Mexico City, Mexico

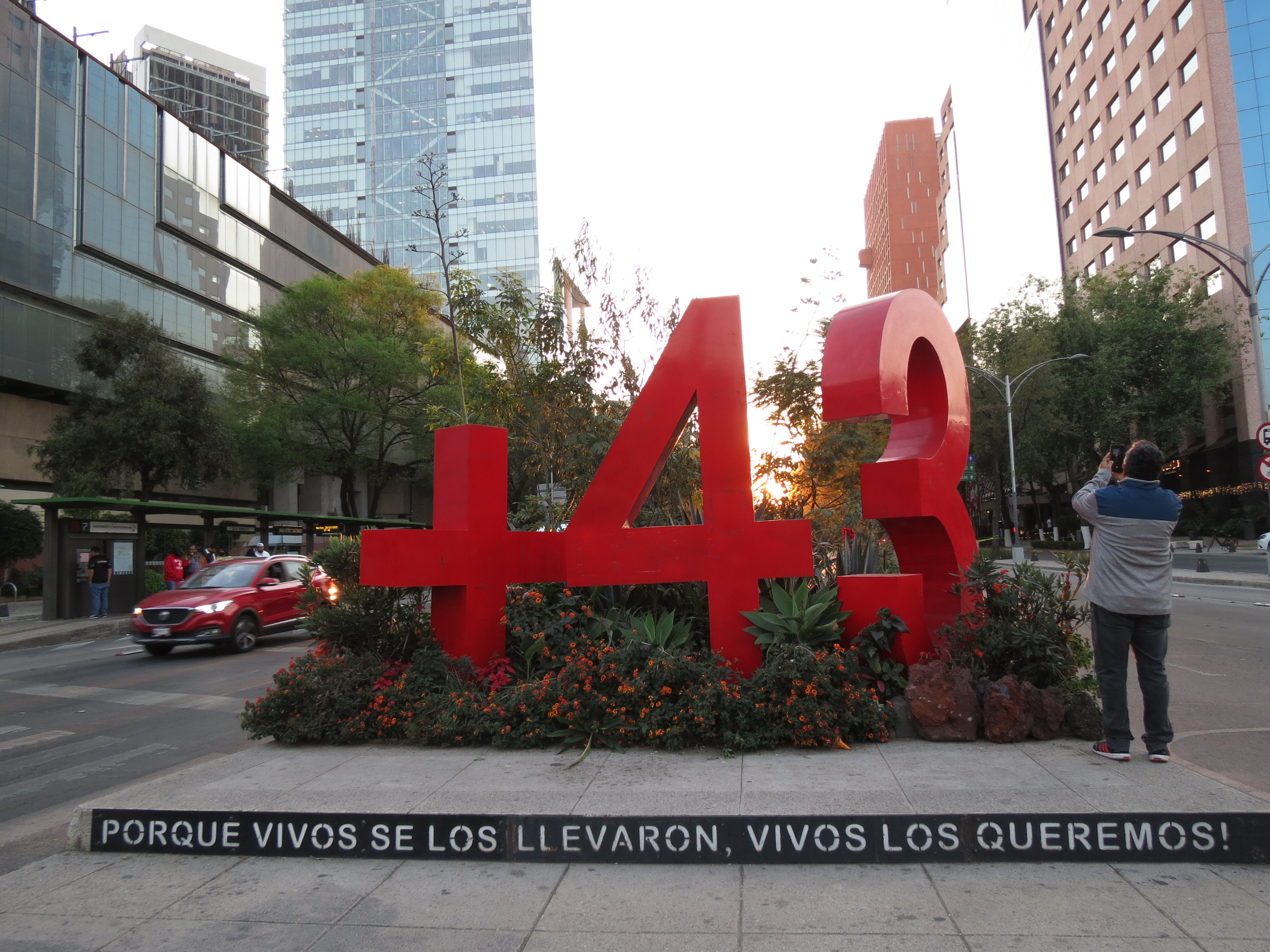
- The anti-monument in 2021
- Location
- Location: Mexico City, Mexico
- Coordinates: 19°26′07″N 99°09′0.2″W
- Designer: Anonymous demonstrators
- Type: Antimonumento
- Material: Steel
- Height: Around 3 m (9.8 ft)
- Opening date: 26 April 2015
- Dedicated to: The victims of the 2014 Iguala mass kidnapping

An antimonumento was installed in front of the Superior Court of Justice of Mexico City, on the median strip of Paseo de la Reforma Avenue, in the Cuauhtémoc borough of Mexico City. The work included the installation of a red number 43 made of metal along with a plus symbol, in reference to the forty-three students kidnapped—and possibly killed—in Iguala, Guerrero, in 2014 after being arrested for allegedly committing criminal offenses, plus the six students and witnesses killed during that event, and to honor the more than 150,000 people killed since the start of the Mexican drug war and the 30,000 disappeared persons reported by 2015. The anti-monument was installed by peaceful protesters during a demonstration on 26 April 2015 as a plea for justice and to prevent the case from being forgotten by the authorities and society. The sculpture became the first of its kind in Mexico and would inspire the installation of other guerrilla-like memorials throughout the city and in other states of the country.

The artwork was never given an official name and those who installed it referred to it simply as either Antimonumento or +43. After the subsequent installation of other unnamed anti-monuments, like the Antimonumento +65 and the Antimonumento +72, the Antimonumento +43 received its name after its physical characteristics. Demonstrators added the slogan of those seeking justice for the case ("Because they were taken alive, we want them back alive!") to the border of the sidewalk and subsequently installed a complement in front of both elements, a concrete turtle with forty-three rocks on its shell with little turtles painted with the names of each of the disappeared on them.

== Background ==
On 26 September 2014, around 100 students of the Ayotzinapa Rural Teachers' College in Tixtla, Guerrero, left in buses towards Mexico City to take part in a protest for the anniversary of the Tlatelolco massacre (1968) on 2 October. The buses were illegally obtained due to the lack of resources to buy or rent them. When they arrived in Iguala, approximately 112 kilometers (70 mi) from Tixtla, the students split into two groups, some waited to rest on the highway while the second group went to the city's toll booth, where they abducted an intercity bus driver. He agreed to cooperate as long as he was allowed to drop off his passengers at the local bus station. There, the driver spoke to security guards who contacted local authorities. As time passed, the students at the station became suspicious and contacted the other group. Upon arrival, they hijacked three more buses and split into five groups, three went through the city and the remaining went back to the highway. A municipal patrol intercepted the city group in traffic and began firing warning shots. The buses continued on their way and the students responded with stones. After that, more patrols joined the chase and started to shoot at the buses. Seeing themselves surrounded, the students got off and responded by throwing more stones at the officers and these fired their weapons back. Six people (including students and witnesses) were killed, twenty-five people were wounded and forty-three students were arrested. None of those who were arrested was taken into custody and their whereabouts have been unknown since that night. The federal investigation, led by the attorney general of Mexico, Jesús Murillo Karam, concluded that the mayor of Iguala, José Luis Abarca Velázquez, and his wife, María de los Ángeles Pineda Villa, were holding an event that would be affected negatively by the students. The mayor ordered their apprehension and they were subsequently handed over to members of the local drug gang, Guerreros Unidos, who killed them and disposed of their bodies in the nearby Cocula Municipality.

== Protests and installation ==
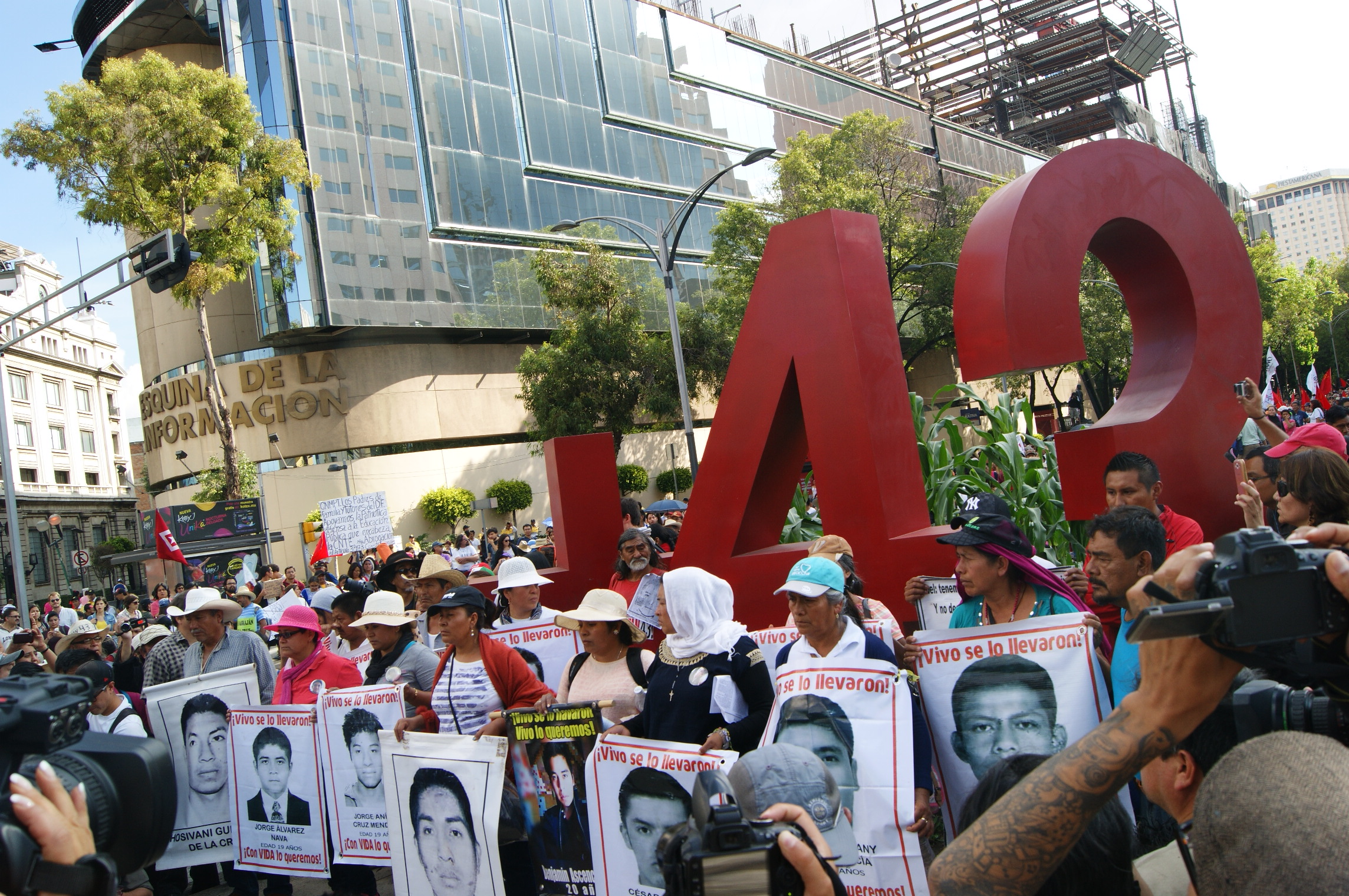
A protest ten months after the kidnappings

After the event was publicized on social networks, multiple protests erupted across the country. Demonstrators created slogans like "We are missing 43!" and "It was the state" and demanded the resignation of the president of Mexico, Enrique Peña Nieto. Since the kidnappings, every 26th of every month, family members and demonstrators march in the streets of Mexico City demanding justice.

During the seventh month of protests, on the afternoon of 26 April 2015, unlike the previous demonstrations, in which protesters walked through the streets demanding justice, organizers created a cultural festival in front of the National Lottery for Public Assistance building on Paseo de la Reforma Avenue, within the limits of downtown Mexico City. Approximately 100 people gathered and were asked to create a human barrier as a truck arrived at the intersection of Reforma, Juárez and Bucarelli Avenues. There, the demonstrators began to dig in the gardens of the Reforma median strip in order to place three red-painted metal figures: a plus symbol, a number four and a number three. They handed out flyers titled "+43, an anti-monument for memory and justice". There, they wrote:

"If a monument refers to an event of the past that must be [learned] (in Latin monumentum means memory), the +43 project is the construction of an anti-monument because it does not aspire to perpetuate the memory, but to alter the perception that a fact is immovable. +43 is defined as a permanent protest to demand justice from the State in the public space. +43 wants to be a call of attention to the passers-by who cross the area on a daily basis. It is an anti-monument because it is a transgression and a claim to the State that wants to forget—and wants us to forget!—the terrible reality of daily violence to which it subjects us and which has claimed the lives of more than 150,000 people and has disappeared more than 30,000 + 43. What is even more terrible is that every day the number of murdered and disappeared people increases, under the total impunity and responsibility of the Mexican State".

The numbers are made of steel and have an approximate height of 3 meters (9.8 ft). They were brought from the state of Jalisco, in western Mexico. The figures' foundations were covered with concrete and the protesters installed the phrase "¡Porque vivos se los llevaron, vivos los queremos!" ("Because alive they were taken, alive we want them back!") in front of the anti-monument on the edge of the sidewalk and stayed during the night to prevent the Government of Mexico City from removing them. The truck driver was arrested but released hours later.

== Reception ==
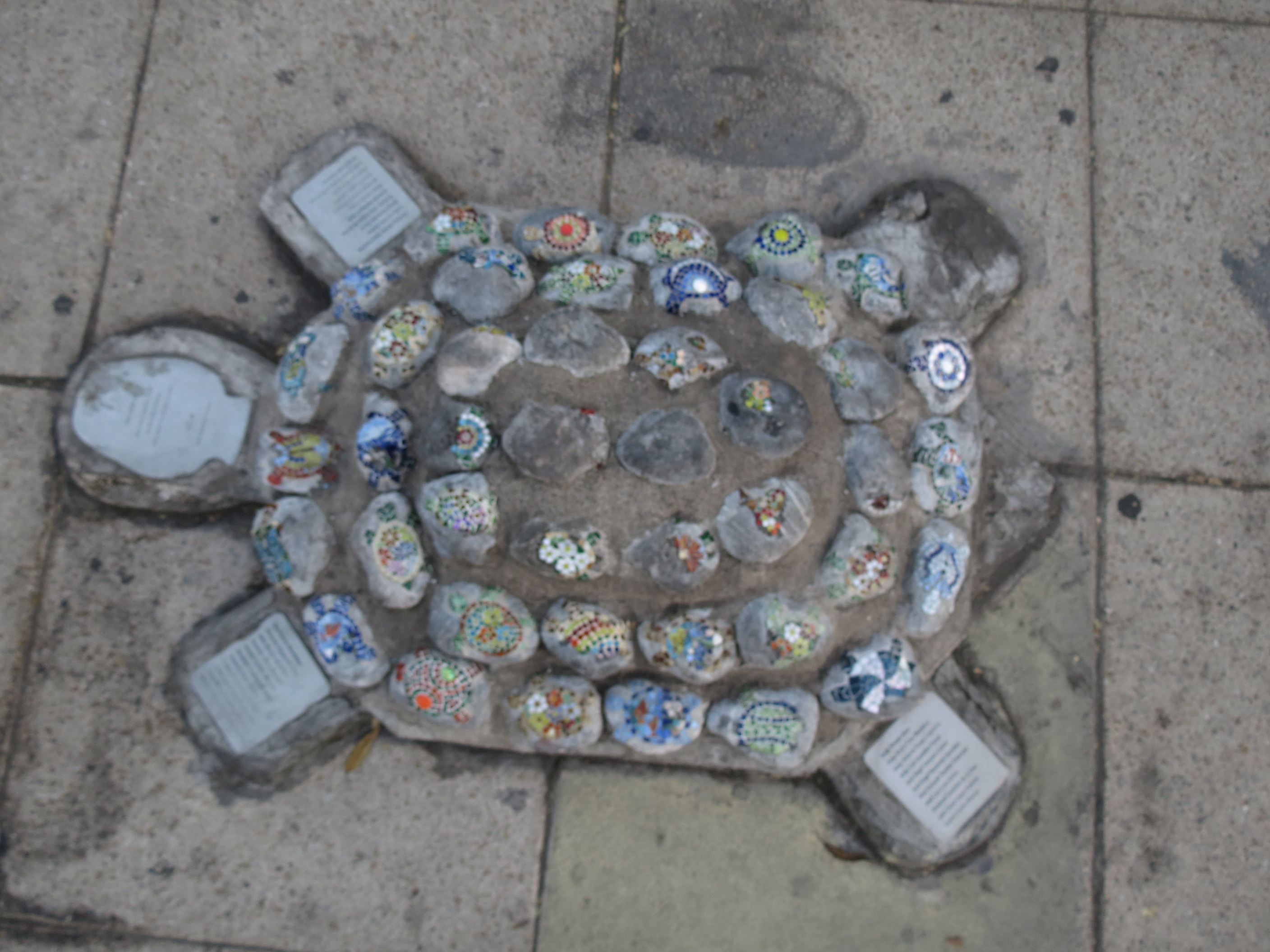
The concrete turtle that was erected five years later

The sculpture became the first antimonumento to be installed in Mexico and since then multiple guerrilla-like memorials have been erected there. A similar work was installed by the Government of Acapulco, Guerrero, to commemorate the fifth anniversary of the kidnappings.

Cristina Híjar González, researcher at the National Center for Research, Documentation, and Information on the Arts, commented that the work "is a step ahead in collective action for the [safe return] of the detained-missing students of Ayotzinapa. It means a political-aesthetic act of living memory and resistance that [enhances] the repertoire of recent protest in Mexico".
