= Anti-monuments in Mexico =

Politically motivated art movement

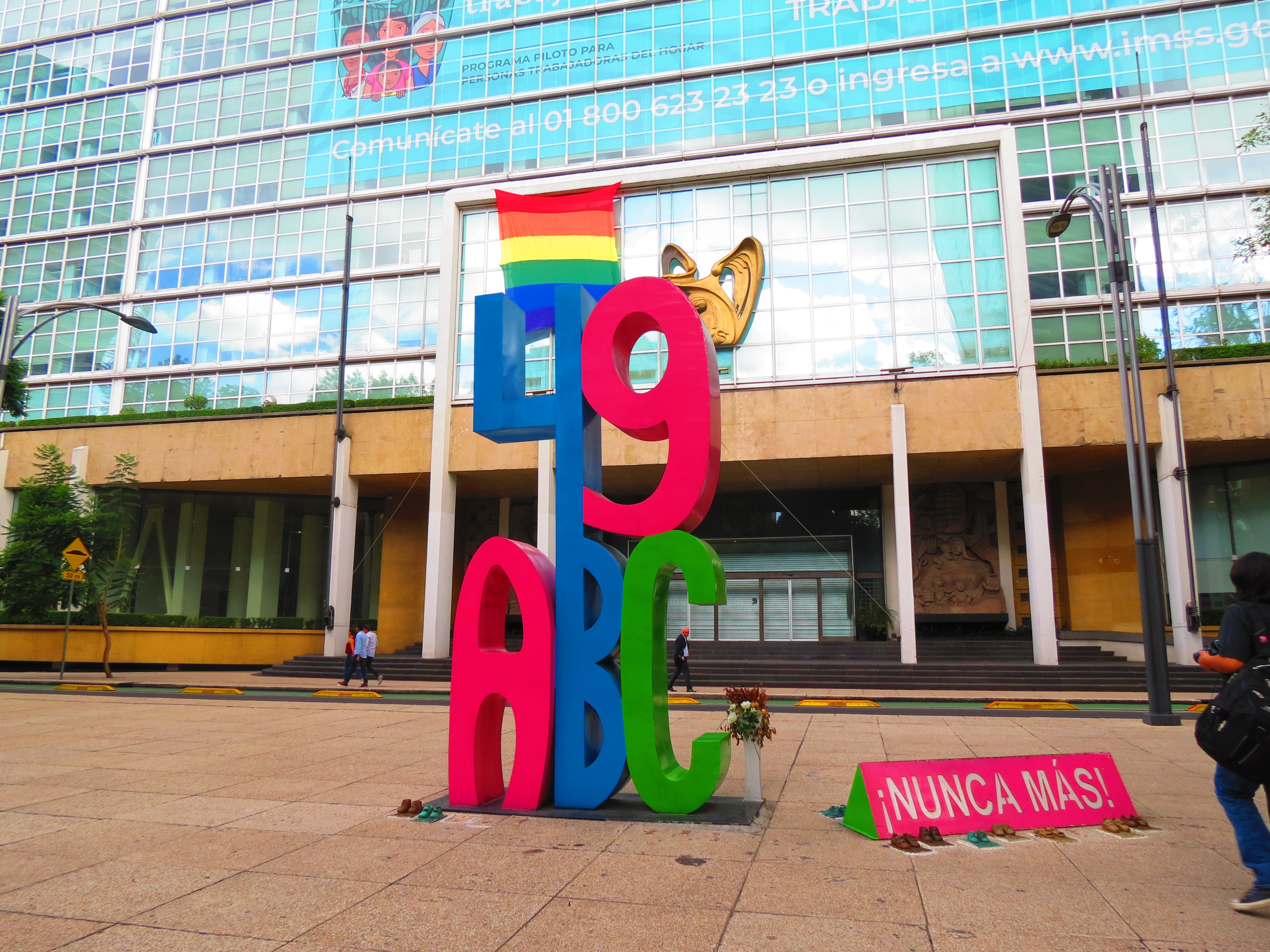
Anti-monument in honor of the 49 children who were killed during the 2009 Hermosillo daycare center fire. The phrase "Never again" is written in Spanish.

In Mexico, an antimonumento (Spanish for 'anti-monument') is a structure that is traditionally installed during popular protests. They are installed to recall a tragic event or to maintain the claim for justice to which governments have failed to provide a satisfactory response in the eyes of the complainant. Many of these are erected for issues related to forced disappearances, massacres, femicides and other forms of violence against women, or any other act of violence.

== Concept ==
The term anti-monument finds its genealogy in the reflections of James E. Young. After World War II, Young looked at "those devices of memory that do not seek to glorify national glory but to do a living memory work through the experiences of the victims", in contrast to the traditional monuments that exalted nationalist heroism. In Latin America, anti-monuments emerged as a way of dealing through the arts with "the violence of the State, as in the cases of Nazism and Latin American dictatorships".

In Mexico, anti-monuments have emerged as protest art and a rejection of the state. If traditional monuments are usually installed by the state to last and represent official positions, the anti-monument has the opposite function which "does not imply a denial of the importance of monuments". That is, it tries to remember those victims who did not achieve justice so that "their cases do not fall into oblivion". Thus, according to anthropologist Alfonso Díaz Tovar, the anti-monuments arise in this way to "deconstruct" the "official positions through an appropriation of public space". The anti-monuments have also been interpreted as "a new way of dealing with the new role of memory". According to the authors of the Antimonumento +43, the first anti-monument, they decided to use the term antimonumento because they considered an error to name it a monumento, as those refer to the past and they did not want the Iguala mass kidnapping to be forgotten. Even though they considered calling it contramonumento at some point, they agreed with the name antimonumento instead.

== Cause and implications ==
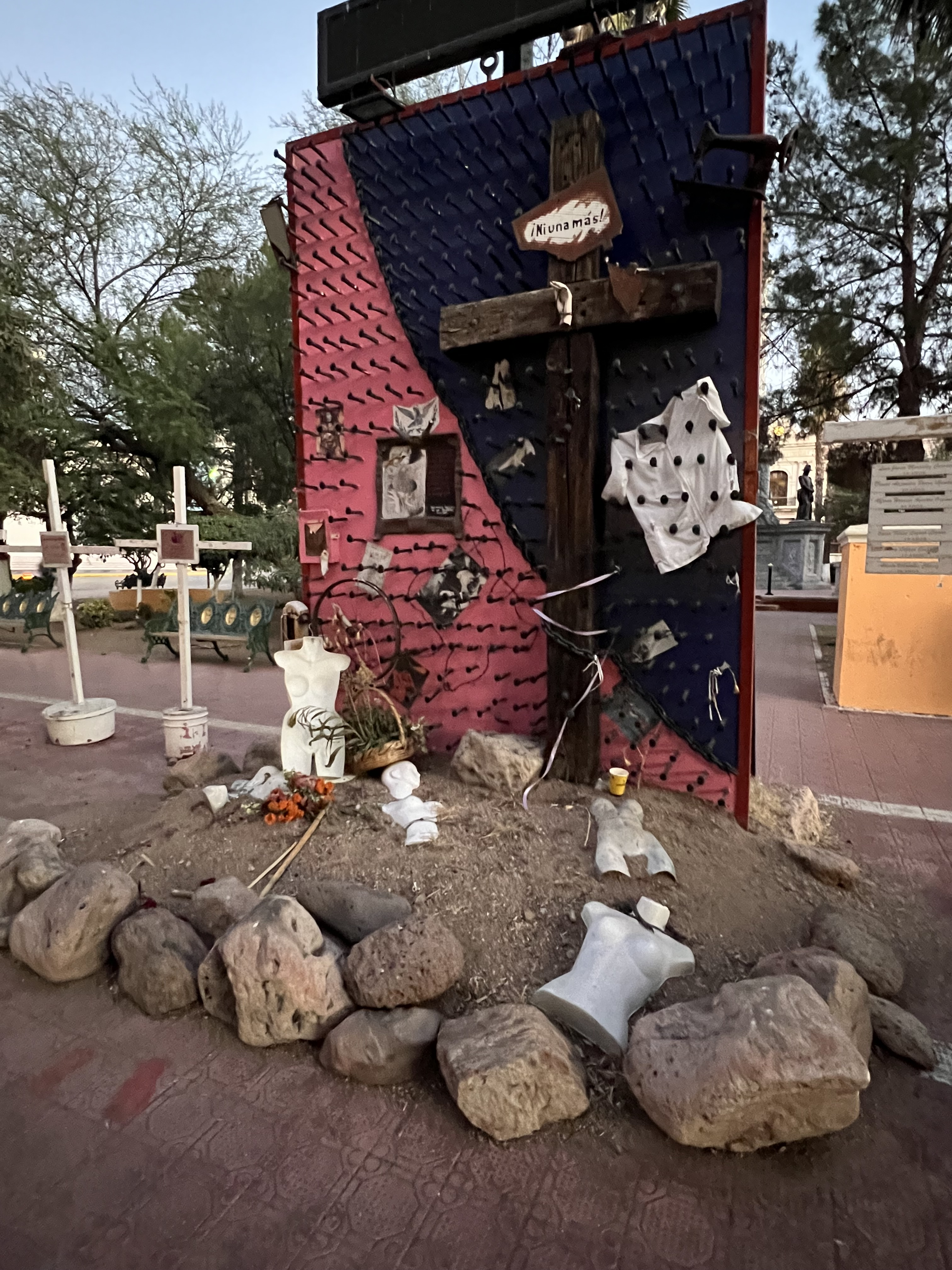
The Cruz de Clavos (nail cross) placed in Chihuahua, Chihuahua, in memory of the victims of femicide during the 1990s and 2000s. Rosa Salazar considers similar protests as a precursor of the anti-monuments.

Mexico, in addition to having one of the highest crime rates in the world, also is a country where nine out of ten reported crimes are left unpunished. As a result, anti-monuments have emerged as a way to remember the victims and prevent their cases from falling into oblivion. For Rosa Salazar, a human rights, communication, and ICT Laboratory coordinator, anti-monuments have a function similar to that of memorials. Anti-monuments leave behind the idea that aesthetic objects "were only judged by their beauty, according to a given artistic canon". Apart from their aesthetic appearance, anti-monuments are "artifacts charged with affection" that, with their subversive activities in the public space, tend to reinstate its communitarian sense. For Eunice Hernández, a cultural facilitator, their location is key to prevent the issue from fading into oblivion, since those spaces are emblematic and represent a hegemonic power.

== Government position ==
Anti-monuments are rarely removed by the authorities once they are established. Although not removing them can affect the image of the government, removing them would imply that they have no interest in resolving the cause of their placement. After being installed, several sit-in groups remain in the area watching over the anti-monuments to prevent the authorities from removing them. In some instances, some governments have installed their own anti-monuments and in other cases have tried to dialogue with the protesters to decide where or how they should be installed. For philosopher Irene Tello Arista, these actions represent an absence of political commitment to change the situation that originated them.

== Antimonumenta ==
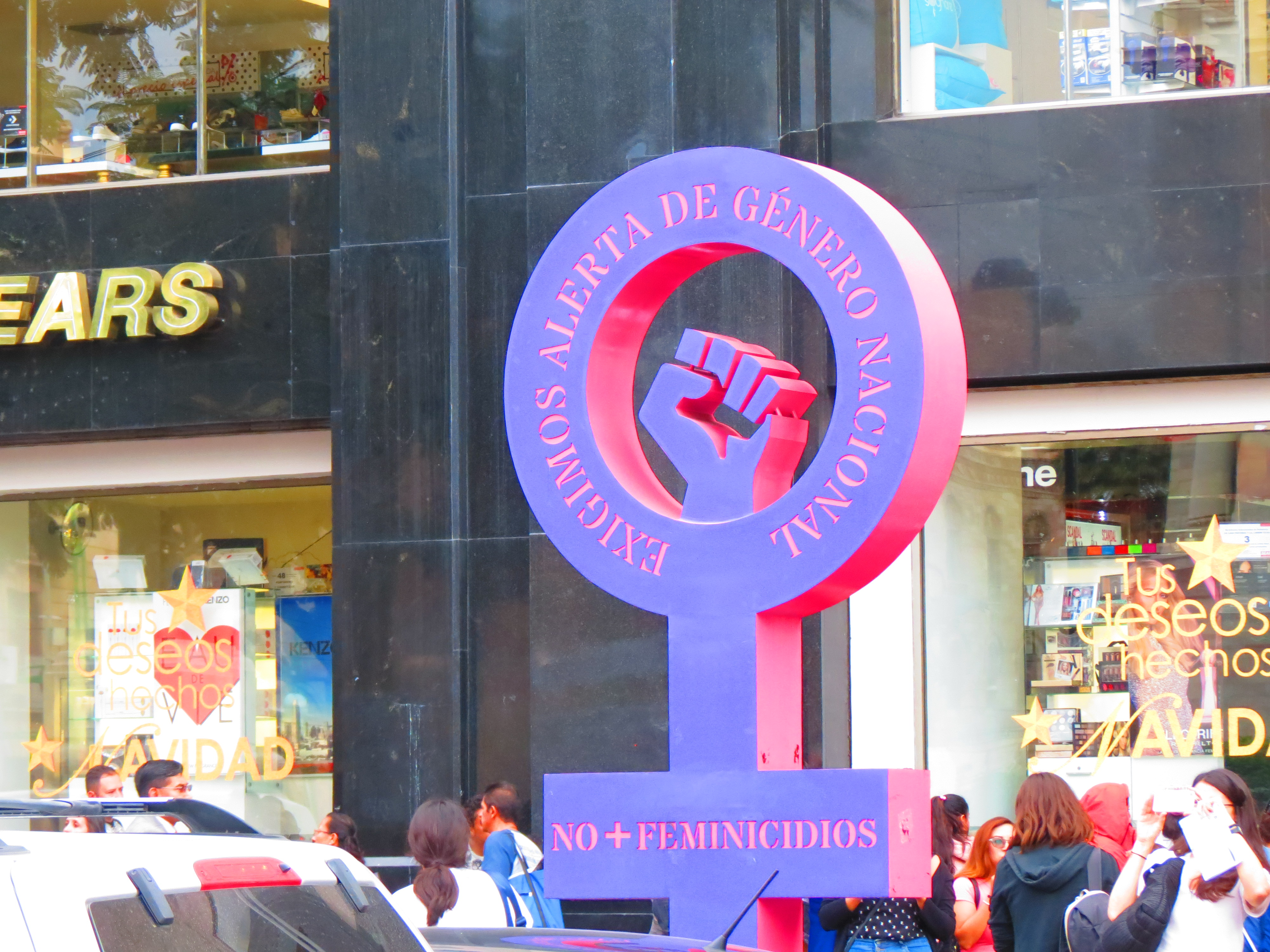
The Antimonumenta in the historic center of Mexico City

The antimonumenta is a type of anti-monument erected to demand justice for the victims of gender violence and femicides in the country. The first antimonumenta was erected on 8 March 2019, the date commemorating International Women's Day. It was installed on Juárez Avenue, in front of the Palace of Fine Arts in downtown Mexico City during the annual march of women protesting against gender violence. Since then, similar monuments have been installed throughout the country. The Antimonumenta represents the symbol of the feminist struggle, which is based on the symbol of Venus with a raised fist in the center. The antimonumentas of Mexico City and Guadalajara, for example, are purple. The color represents the history of the feminist struggle: "loyalty, constancy towards a purpose, unwavering firmness towards a cause".

== See also ==
- Feminism in Mexico
- Guerrilla sculpture
- Memorial to Victims of Violence in Mexico, a memorial installed by the government in 2013
- Monumento a los Niños Héroes (Guadalajara), a traffic circle in which the city authorities allowed the transformation into a memorial
- Parque de las Mujeres, a park in Puerto Vallarta with a memorial to victims of femicide
