= Glorieta de las mujeres que luchan =

Anti-monument in Mexico City

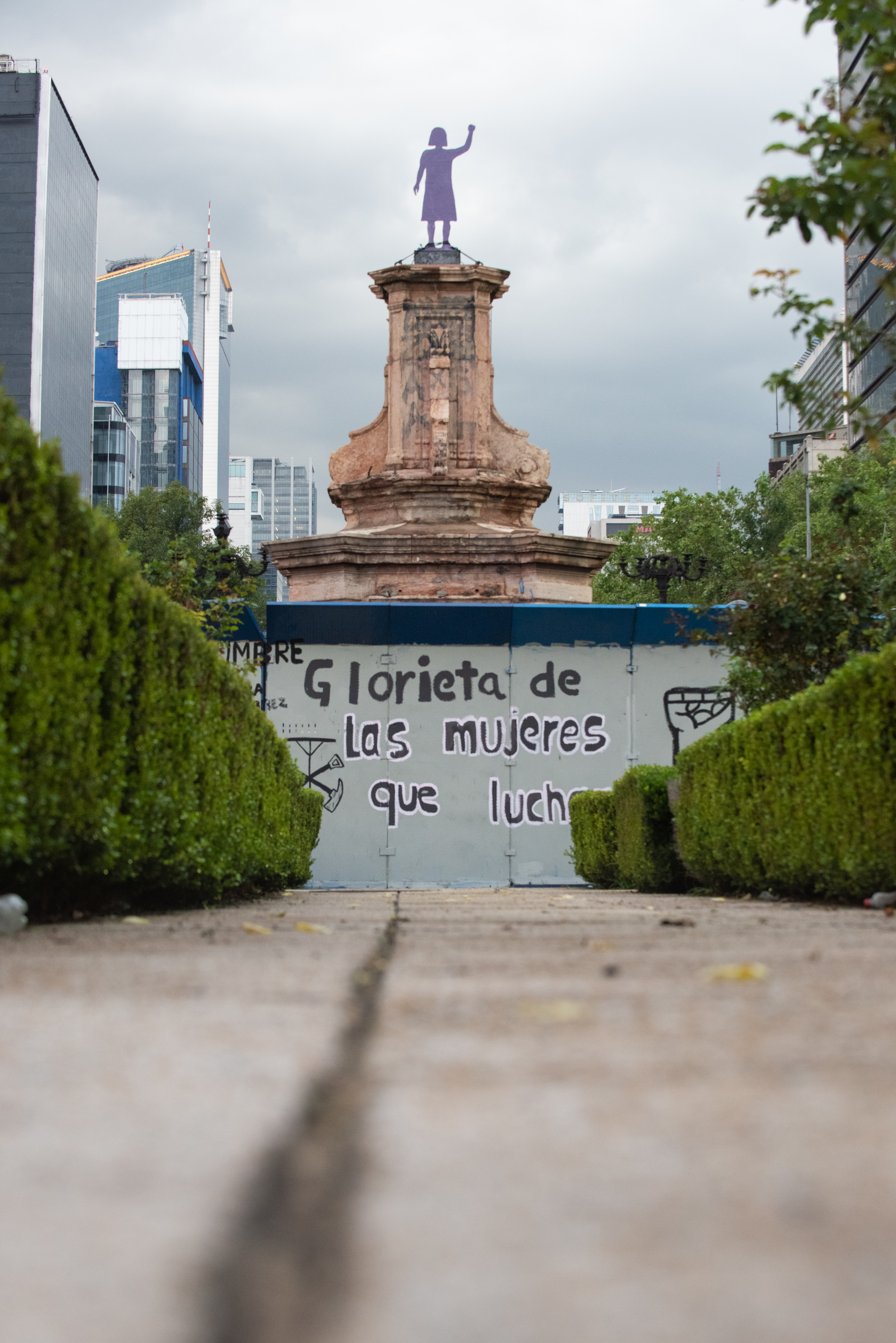
- The roundabout a few hours after the sculpture was installed
- Location
- Location: Mexico City, Mexico
- Coordinates: 19°25′59″N 99°09′17″W
- Designer: Feminists
- Type: Antimonumenta
- Material: Steel (formerly wood)
- Height: 2.3 m (7 ft 7 in) (formerly 1.9 m [6 ft 3 in])
- Opening date: 25 September 2021; 4 years ago
- Dedicated to: Women

The Glorieta de las mujeres que luchan is the proposed name of a roundabout along Paseo de la Reforma Avenue, in Mexico City. At its center is an anti-monument (antimonumenta) installed on a previously empty plinth.

On the afternoon of 25 September 2021, a group of anonymous feminists intervened at the Christopher Columbus roundabout. On an empty plinth surrounded by protective fences, they installed a wooden guerrilla-style sculpture demanding justice for the recurrent acts of violence against women in Mexico. Originally named Antimonumenta Vivas Nos Queremos (lit. transl. Anti-monument We Want Us Alive), the piece later became known simply as Justicia. It depicts a purple woman holding her left arm raised and the Spanish word for justice carved into a support at the back. The roundabout itself was also symbolically renamed Glorieta de las mujeres que luchan (Roundabout of the Women Who Fight).

The traffic circle formerly honored Columbus with a statue sculpted by French artist Charles Cordier, installed in 1887. Ahead of a 2020 anti-Columbus Day protest, Mexico City's administration, led by its head of government Claudia Sheinbaum, removed the statue from its pedestal citing restoration as the reason. Months later, Sheinbaum announced that the statue would not be returned to its original site. Instead, following a petition signed by 5,000 Indigenous women calling for the decolonization of the avenue, a new monument would be erected in their honor. The proposed project, named Tlali, was to be a sculpture inspired by Olmec colossal heads, created by a non-Indigenous male artist, Pedro Reyes. Since all Olmec heads depict men, and the artist was not Indigenous, feminists criticized the proposal as inappropriate for honoring Indigenous women. Days later, they installed Justicia on the plinth.

The sculpture was not initially intended to be a permanent installation; according to the feminists who placed it, the city could choose a different artwork as long as the government renamed the traffic circle officially the Glorieta de las mujeres que luchan. Since its placement, feminists have organized cultural events at the roundabout to honor women they describe as fighters, as well as men who support them. Many of their names have been written or memorialized on the protective fences surrounding the plinth. Activists also installed a clothesline to denounce injustices committed by authorities and society, and later replaced the original wooden sculpture with a steel version.

Sheinbaum, for her part, replaced the Tlalli project and stated that the government of the city intended to officially replace the Monument to Columbus with a replica of The Young Woman of Amajac, a pre-Hispanic Huastec sculpture depicting an Indigenous woman. The anti-monument would be relocated elsewhere, an action feminists opposed unless their demands were met. After months of debate, in February 2023, Sheinbaum declared that both Justicia and The Young Woman of Amajac would coexist in the same traffic circle, while the Columbus sculpture would be relocated to the National Museum of the Viceroyalty, in Tepotzotlán, State of Mexico. To prevent further conflicts, Sheinbaum's interim successor, Martí Batres, installed the replica on an adjacent traffic island.

== Background ==
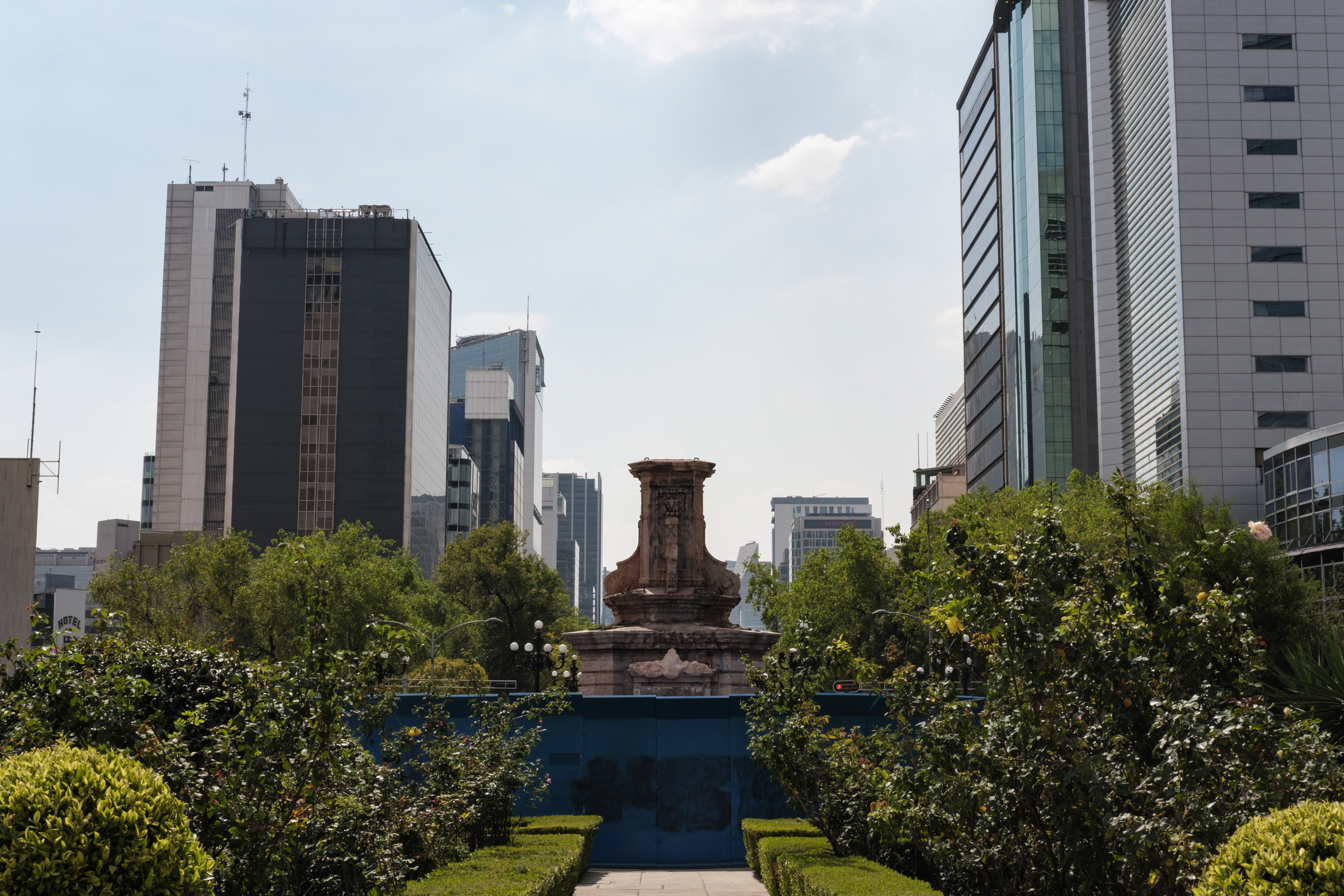
The plinth where the Columbus statue once stood, photographed just hours after its removal.

The statue of Christopher Columbus on Paseo de la Reforma, one of two Mexico City monuments dedicated to Christopher Columbus, was removed on 10 October 2020, just two days before a planned protest aimed at toppling it on Columbus Day According to the government of the city, it was removed as part of a series of restorations performed by the National Institute of Anthropology and History (INAH). The head of government Claudia Sheinbaum announced that public consultations regarding the monument's future would be held in 2021. However, these discussions did not take place, and the city ultimately decided to replace the Columbus statue with Tlali, a large female head sculpture by Pedro Reyes. Inspired by the male Olmec colossal heads, the project aimed to honor 500 years of Indigenous women's resistance in Mexico. The city government stated that the removal followed a petition signed by 5,000 Indigenous women calling for the "decolonization of Paseo de la Reforma".

Tlalli sparked several controversies, including the selection of Reyes, a mestizo man, to represent Mexican Indigenous women, as well as its design and name. Academics such as the researcher Lucía Melgar and Mixe writer Yásnaya Aguilar voiced objections. Melgar argued that the project exemplified how women, particularly Indigenous women, are often portrayed as "generic, mute and immobilized". Aguilar questioned the use of a Nahuatl word (Tlalli means land or earth) to name a project inspired on the Olmec culture, which spoke Mixe–Zoque. In response to the backlash, Sheinbaum postponed the installation and announced that a committee would handle the proposal.

== History ==
=== Installation and description ===
Leaflets provided by installers
"From this moment on, this place is La Glorieta de las Mujeres que Luchan and it is dedicated to the women across the country who have faced violence, repression, and revictimization for fighting against injustice. It honors the Searching Women, the Mothers who fight for justice, the Women Defenders of Water and Territory, the women of the Indigenous Peoples, the Indigenous Students, the Historical Indigenous Students, to the Historical Women, to the Zapatista Women, Afromexican Women, Women Defenders... all the women whose struggles have shaped our history, the women who uphold this country with dignity".

On the afternoon of 25 September 2021, a group of feminists crossed the protective fences surrounding the monument and installed a wooden antimonumenta on the empty plinth. It depicted a 1.9 m (6 ft 3 in) tall purple woman with her left fist raised. They secured it to the pedestal using multiple ropes and pre-existing steel staples embedded in cement. The installers referred to the sculpture by various names: the Antimonumenta Vivas Nos Queremos (Anti-monument We Want Us Alive), Justicia (Justice), or La Muchacha (The Girl). They symbolically renamed the traffic circle as the Glorieta de las mujeres que luchan (Roundabout of Women Who Fight).

The installation occurred as a protest against the recurrent acts of violence against women in Mexico, a country that is commonly ranked among unequal and hostile countries for women, according to reports that include those of the Organisation for Economic Co-operation and Development, the Georgetown University's Women Peace and Security Index 2019/20, or the United Nations Development Programme's Gender Inequality Index. As stated by the authors, the project arose after the removal of the statue of Columbus but remained in the planning stages until the announcement of Tlalli. The decision to move forward with the installation was made after observing what they described as a series of missteps by the authorities. Throughout those months, various women's organizations clandestinely planned the placement of the artwork, inviting victims and human rights advocates to participate.

During the installation, the feminists called for the creation of an artistic committee composed of Indigenous women to select a replacement sculpture by consensus. They emphasized that they did not want to impose their choice of a statue, saying, "You decide the figure, we have renamed the roundabout". They further explained that their representation was created to honor of all the women who have fought for justice throughout the nation, that is, from "the brave women of independence up to the present day and also those who were killed fighting for justice". Additionally, while a group installed the Justicia sculpture, another one painted the names of murdered and disappeared women on the protective fences, like that of Marisela Escobedo Ortiz, who was killed while protesting the murder of her daughter. Some names include those of living women who, they say, have resisted injustice. In preparation for the memorial, research was conducted on Indigenous women, mothers of femicide victims, historical figures, defenders of water, land, and life, as well as women journalists.

The city government covered the names with paint just hours later. Sheinbaum said it was a routine action, as cleanup crews are authorized to carry out maintenance work after demonstrations in the city. A group of feminists returned the following day, the seventh anniversary of the Iguala mass kidnapping, and repainted the names, adding the phrase, "You will not erase us", in Spanish. During an abortion rights demonstration on 3 October 2021, the names were restored once again after being covered up during the week. In addition to women, the names of men who have fought for women's rights or who have been murdered or disappeared while seeking justice were also included.

=== Events after its installation ===
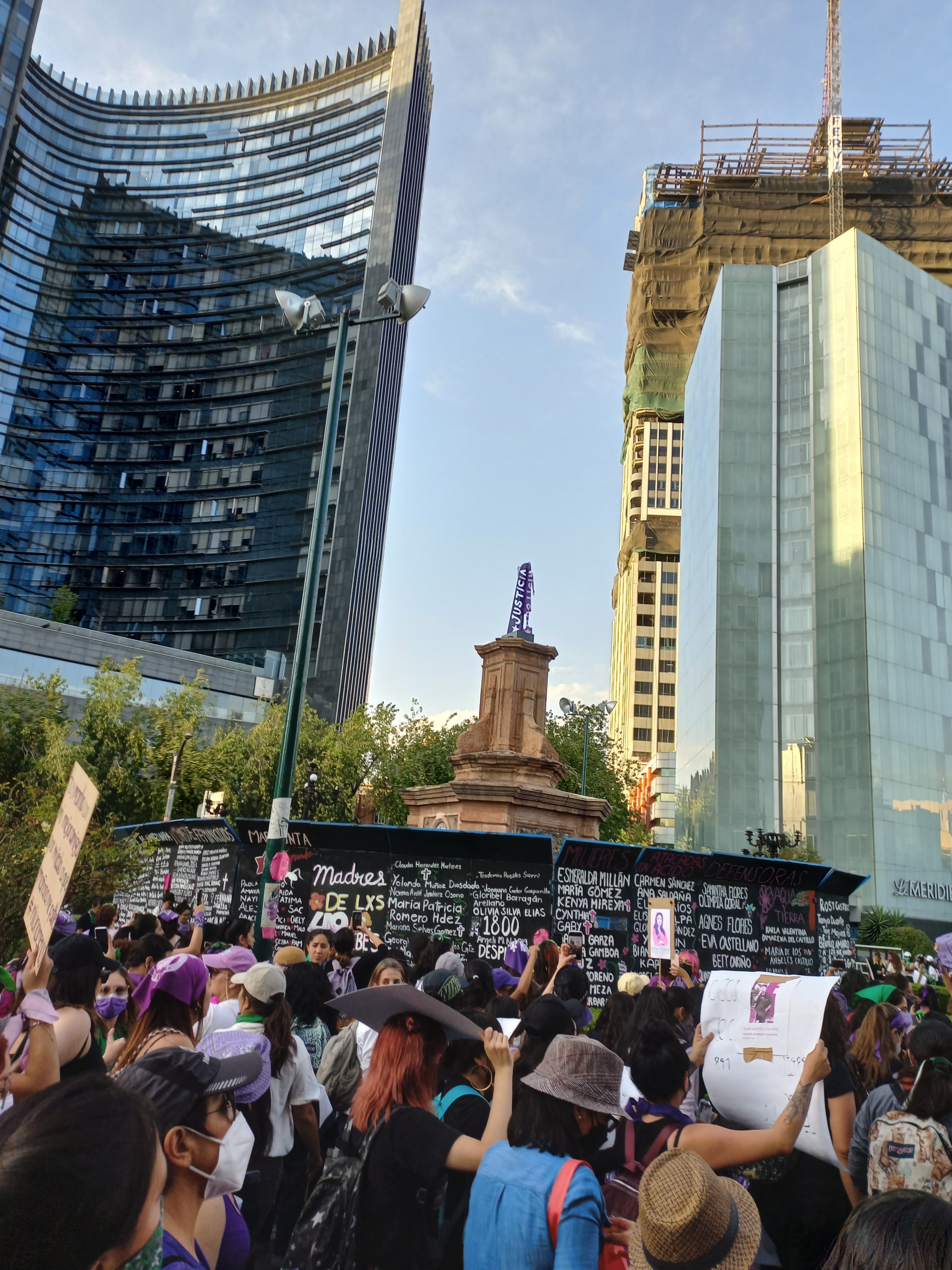
The steel replacement photographed during the 2022 International Women's Day's demonstrations.

On 25 November 2021, the International Day for the Elimination of Violence against Women feminists installed complaints clotheslines – an action inspired by The Clothesline Project, an installation art project by Mónica Mayer. They clothespinned the names of public officials and institutions they believed had ignored, dismissed, or failed to follow up on their complaints. They also sang a protest song there. The next day, male police officers dismantled the clotheslines and attempted to remove the protective fences displaying the names. Upon realizing they were being filmed by groups of women, they repositioned the fences.

On 31 October, a Day of the Dead altar was set up along the roundabout's main path, where feminists had written "México Feminicida" (Mexico Femicidal). They also placed cempasúchil flowers and papel picado sheets bearing the phrase "Fue el estado" ("It was the state") cut into them.

Feminists replaced the original artwork on 5 March 2022 with a steel version that is 2.3 m (7 ft 7 in) tall in anticipation for the International Women's Day demonstrations on 8 March. They also created the Jardín de la Memoria (Garden of Memory), which featured another complaint clothesline displaying 300 testimonies. The garden aimed to bear "the names of historical women [...] who teach us every day through their struggles that dignity must become customary".

Human rights groups unofficially renamed the Glorieta de Colón and Hamburgo stations of the Mexico City Metrobús system as the "Glorieta de las Mujeres Que Luchan" and "Glorieta de las y los Desaparecidos" stations, respectively, on 24 July 2022. The latter renaming honored the nearby anti-monument of the same name. The signage replicated the system's style and the stations' pictograms were replaced with their respective protest symbols. These actions formed part of a broader symbolic renaming of Paseo de la Reforma as the Ruta de la Memoria (Route of Memory), in reference to the various anti-monument memorials located along the avenue.

Several events were held at the roundabout on the first anniversary of the Justicia installation, including the installation of a pink cross, the hanging of photos of missing and murdered persons, and a performance involving dance and song. Reaffirming their opposition to a proposed relocation, the collectives said that the site "not only has to do with the issue of femicide and disappearance, but also the various struggles that women face in the country, namely, Indigenous mothers and the fight for the defense of land [or] water".

A collective placed over 3,000 bras in October 2024 to raise awareness about breast cancer. In January 2025, a memorial service with her body present was held for Montserrat Uribe, a woman who had been missing since 2020.

=== Attempted removal ===
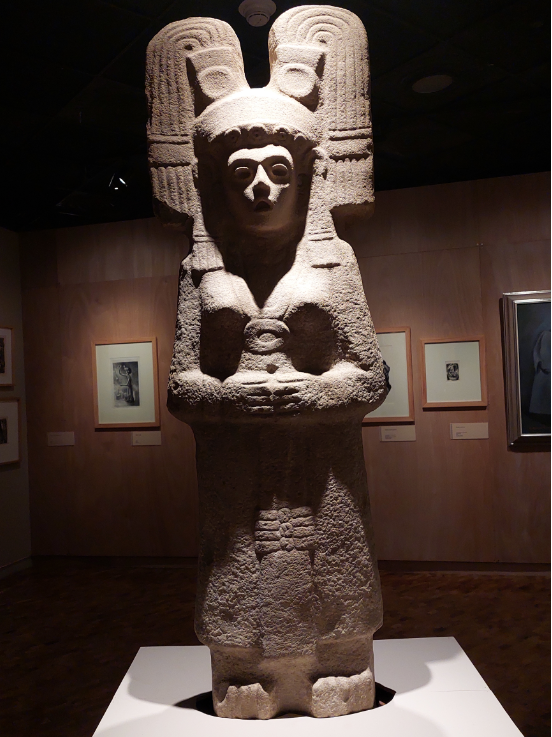
The Young Woman of Amajac, a Huastec sculpture of which the city government placed a replica on Paseo de la Reforma.

On 12 October 2021, the city government announced announced its intention to officially replace the monument to Columbus with a replica of The Young Woman of Amajac, a pre-Hispanic sculpture depicting a woman. Three days later, feminist groups urged the authorities not to remove Justicia unless the roundabout is formally renamed Glorieta de las mujeres que luchan. They also criticized the proposed sculpture, arguing that it likely represents a young elite woman or a ruler. The mother of a murdered teenager said that any alteration would be "an act of direct aggression to the demands of justice".

Sheinbaum said in June 2022 that the replica of The Young Woman of Amajac was nearly complete and that she was in talks with feminist collectives to reach an agreement on the relocation of Justicia. In response, feminist groups asserted that no such talks had taken place as of August 2022 and claimed that the government was only interested in prioritizing its political agenda. They added that "the state wants to hide the fact that 11 to 13 women are murdered each day [and] that more than 30 people disappear each day".

City officials met with representatives from various human rights groups in November 2022 to reach a consensus on the future of the traffic circle. Ricardo Ruiz, Undersecretary of Government, stated that although the groups' requests were respected, no party could impose its will and that the space must remain public. Ingrid Gómez Saracíbar, Secretary of Women, proposed a common agreement to generate a space for coexistence. Argelia Betanzos, a Mazatec lawyer, expressed skepticism about the government's notion of coexistence particularly regarding the statues. She said that Indigenous women already concur in the Glorieta de las mujeres que luchan. Betanzos added that The Young Woman of Amajac does not represent the wishes of Indigenous women but rather serves electoral interests on the part of Sheinbaum's team. She called on the government to apologize for crimes committed against Indigenous peoples before seeking to place a symbol in their name. During the event, a letter from Otomi women was read, requesting that instead of replacing the anti-monument in Reforma, the city government relocate the second statue honoring Columbus (Manuel Vilar, 1892) in the city elsewhere and install The Young Woman of Amajac there. They argued that Paseo de la Reforma had already undergone a process of decolonization.

Following months of discussion, in February 2023, Sheinbaum announced that both Justicia and The Young Woman of Amajac would coexist in the traffic circle, while the statue of Columbus would be relocated to the National Museum of the Viceroyalty, in Tepotzotlán, State of Mexico. Regarding the decision, she added, "We do it because we women have been silenced for a long time [...] and those who have been silenced the most are the Indigenous women". A few days later, during a speech in Morelia, Michoacán, Sheinbaum remarked that there were "deeply racist and classist" women who opposed the installation of The Young Woman of Amajac. The following day, when questioned by feminists and human rights groups, Sheinbaum clarified that that her comment had not been directed at them.

On 7 March 2023, dozens of collective groups published an open letter to Sheinbaum through Amnesty International. In the letter, the collectives expressed concerns that the city government did not acknowledge the relevance of "the social mobilization led by thousands of women [...] who have been and continue to be fundamental for the recognition, guarantee, protection, promotion, and respect of the human rights of all women". The letter concluded with four demands: to recognize the contributions of women in the country's recent history; to respect the installation of Justicia and the Glorieta de las mujeres que luchan; to officially rename the roundabout as Glorieta de las mujeres que luchan; and to respond to calls for justice in order to ensure the right to live with dignity.

Martí Batres, Sheinbaum's interim successor, agreed in July 2023 to relocate The Young Woman of Amajac project to an adjacent traffic island. Indigenous women requested that the original project be resumed and that The Young Woman of Amajac sculpture be placed at the center, as they viewed its relocation as an act of discrimination. They also proposed renaming the roundabout as the Glorieta de las mujeres en resistencia (Roundabout of Women in Resistance).

Collectives have said that due to preparations for the 2026 FIFA World Cup, several anti-monuments related to disappeared persons, including the Glorieta de las mujeres que luchan, may be removed in an effort to obscure the crisis affecting the country.

=== Vandalism ===
Multiple photographic pieces and poems were destroyed or damaged in December 2024.

== Reception ==
Author Sabrina Melenotte noted that the installation roughly "links art, memory and public space" and raises questions on "the role and the legitimate place of artistic and social expressions that serve as monuments". David Pérez wrote for Milenio that the set of protest acts located in the Glorieta de las mujeres que luchan serve to reflect on recurring episodes of violence and acts as a medium highlighting how memory is used in response to violence. César Zayago from the same newspaper opinioned that it "has become a powerful historical symbol and a living tribute to the resilience and courage of the women who continue to fight for equality and justice". Carmen Contreras, a consultant in gendered urban development, observed that the installation follows a trend of urban interventions demonstrating that public institutions demonstrating that public is required to prevent discrimination among citizens in order to achieve justice.

Diana Murrieta, founder of the feminist group Nosotras Para Ellas, wrote in an opinion column for El Heraldo de México that the appropriation of public spaces is important to show women in the country that equality is attainable when actions are carried out collectively. Ayahuitl Estrada, founder of the feminist collective Restauradoras con Glitter, said that such acts allow feminist women to "change the discourse imposed by the state regarding how vulnerable women should be represented". In contrast, in her column for Voces México, art critic Avelina Lésper expressed negative views on the artwork and its installation, arguing that these actions harm feminism by reinforcing perceptions that it is unjustified, radical and violent, and asked feminists not to speak for all women, describing the appropriation as an act of "ideological, populist arrogance, supported by the propaganda of [social] networks". Regarding Justicia, she referred to it as an "aesthetic eyesore" that, in her view, diminishes historical women by reducing them to a symbol resembling the pictogram used for women's restrooms.

Regarding the government’s position on the anti-monument, Fausta Gantús from the Instituto Mora opined that Sheinbaum avoids recognizing the Glorieta de las mujeres que luchan and instead supports an "officialist feminism", endorsed by the female governors from her political party, the National Regeneration Movement. According to Gantús, this posture is aimed primarily at supporting the former president of Mexico and leader of their party, Andrés Manuel López Obrador. Scholar Lucía Melgar commented that if Sheinbaum would stop "wallowing in imaginary achievements, repeating empty speeches, and inventing a courtly 'people'", she could begin to respect the space that feminists have chosen to protest against gender-based violence. In her opinion column in SDP Noticias, Claudia Santillana Rivera recommended that Sheinbaum should pay closer attention to the installation, warning that women would not necessarily vote for her in the 2024 Mexican general election, particularly if she does not show interest in resolving the problems affecting women in the nation.

== Gallery ==
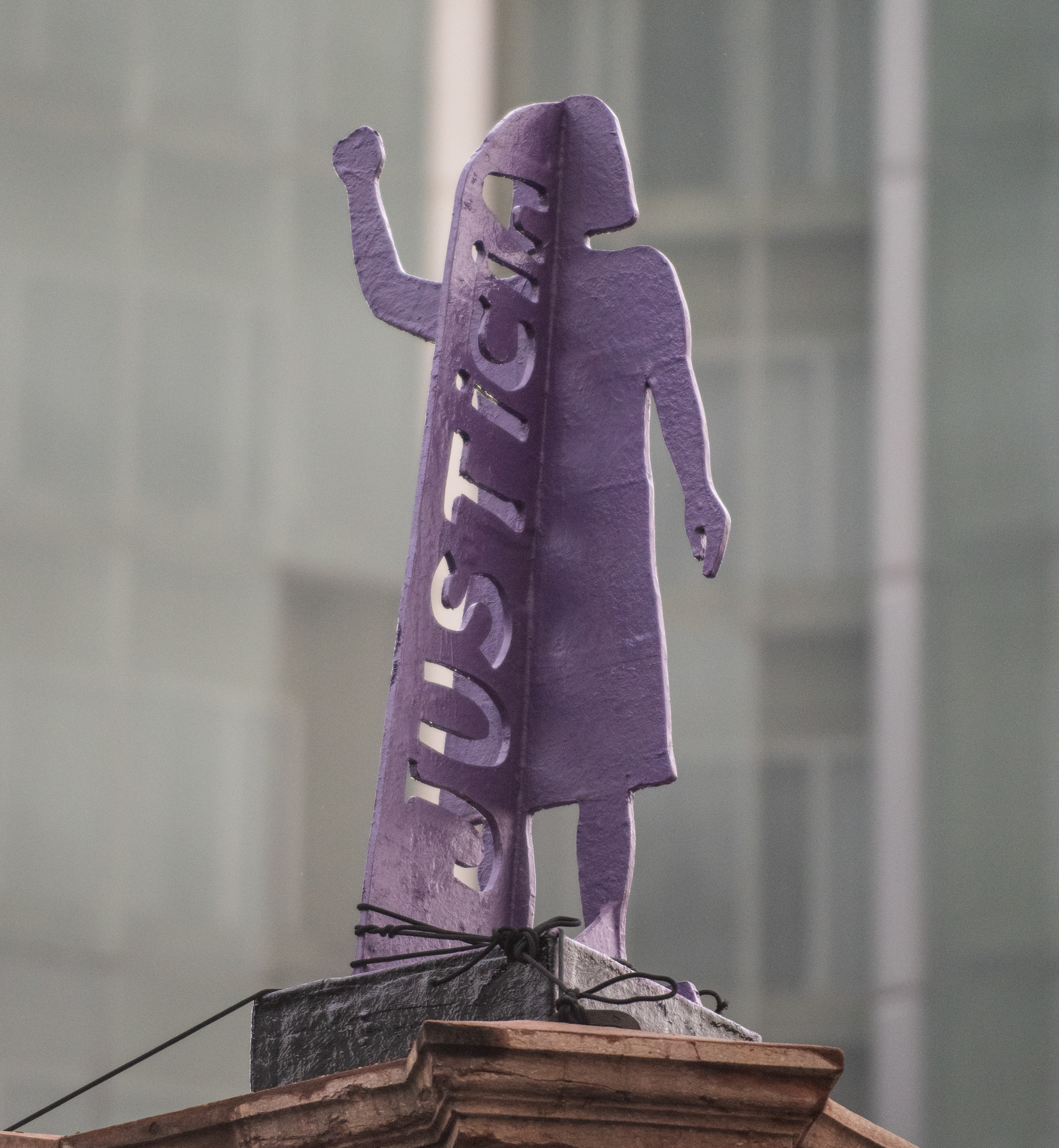
Close-up of the wooden antimonumenta, showing details of how she was tied. The word Justicia ("Justice") is written on the support.

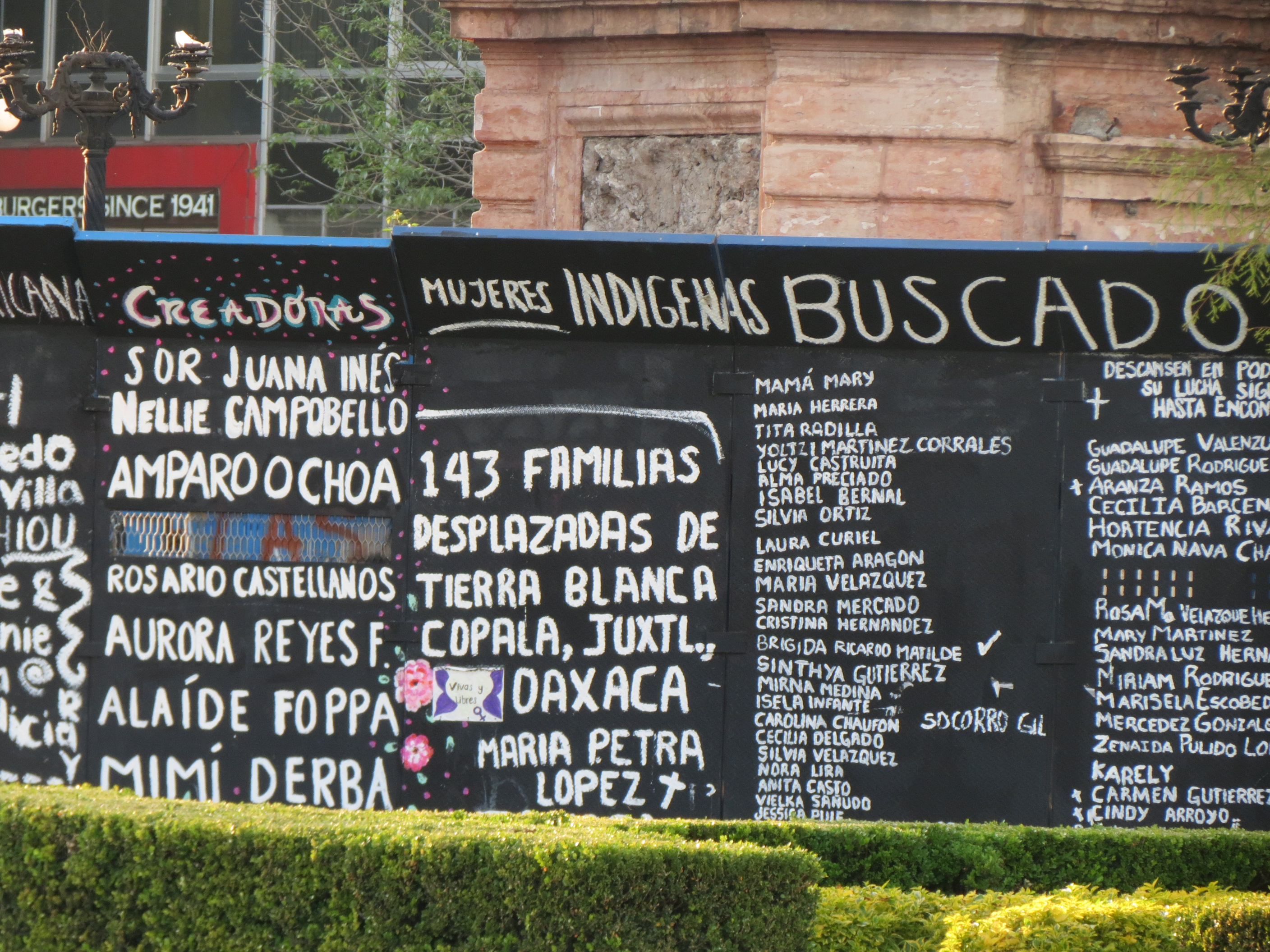
The protective fences display dozens of names written on them.

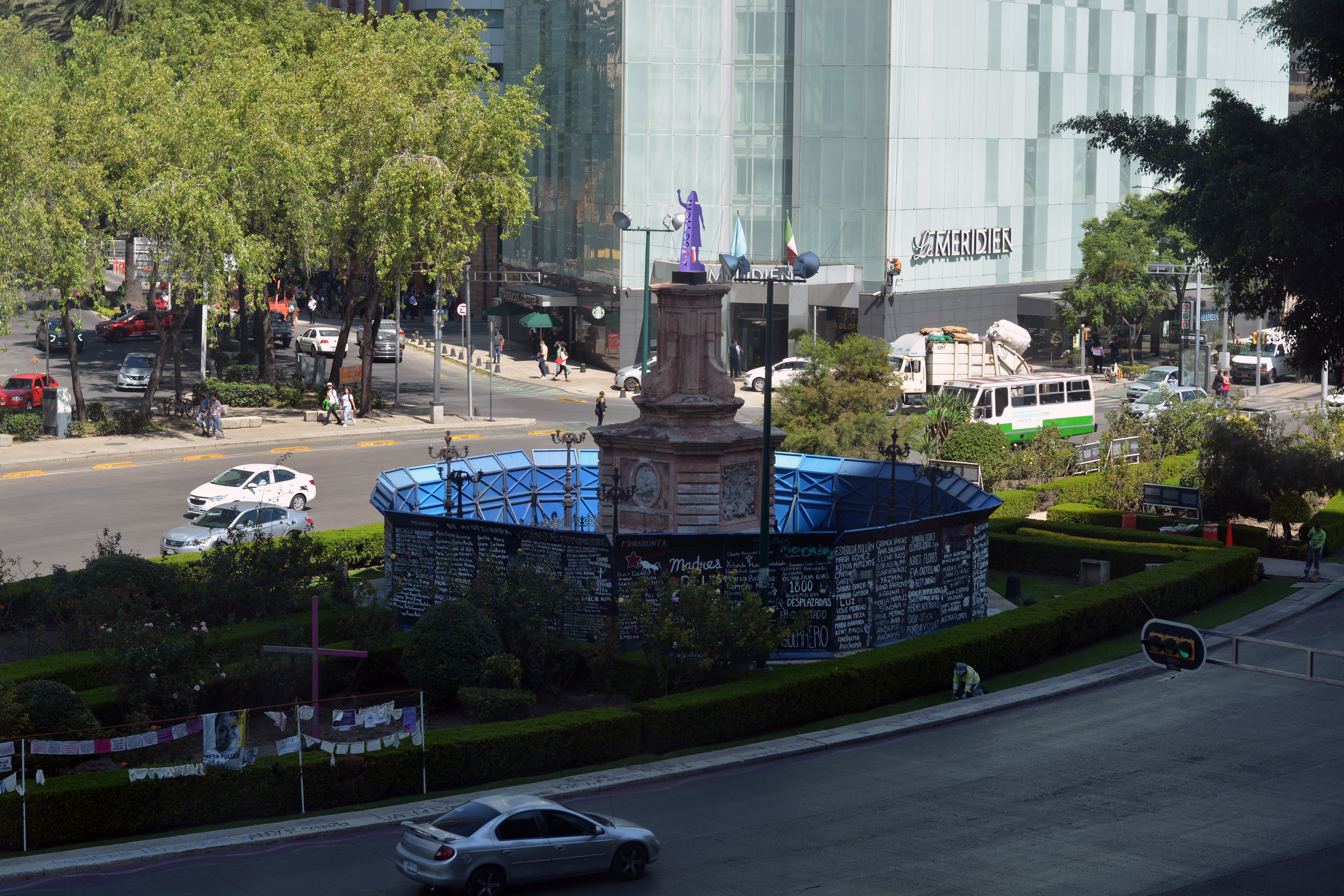
The gardens of the traffic circle feature several exhibitions on the situation of women in the country (Jardín de la Memoria; right) and clotheslines for public denunciations of acts of violence (left).

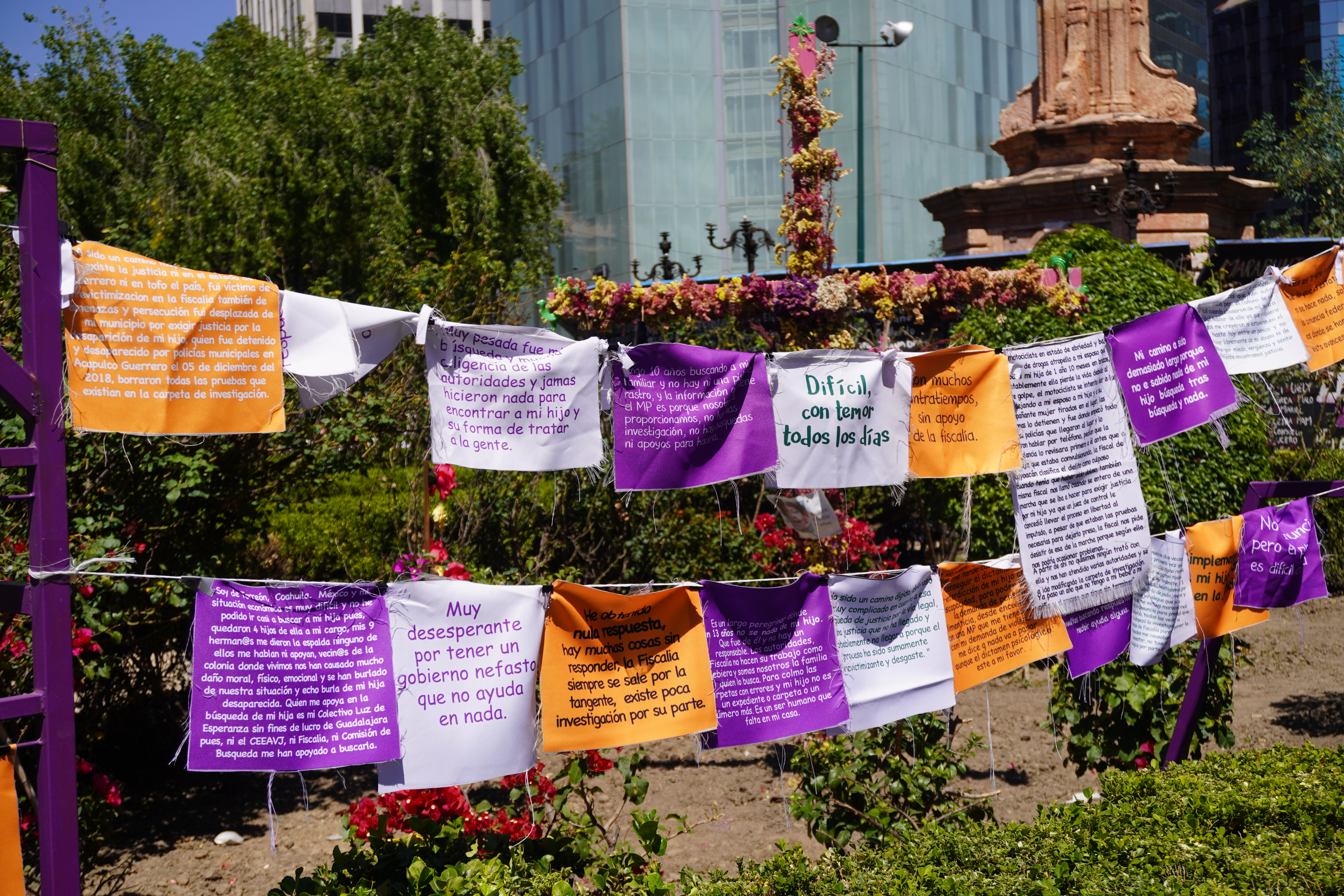
Complaints clotheslines

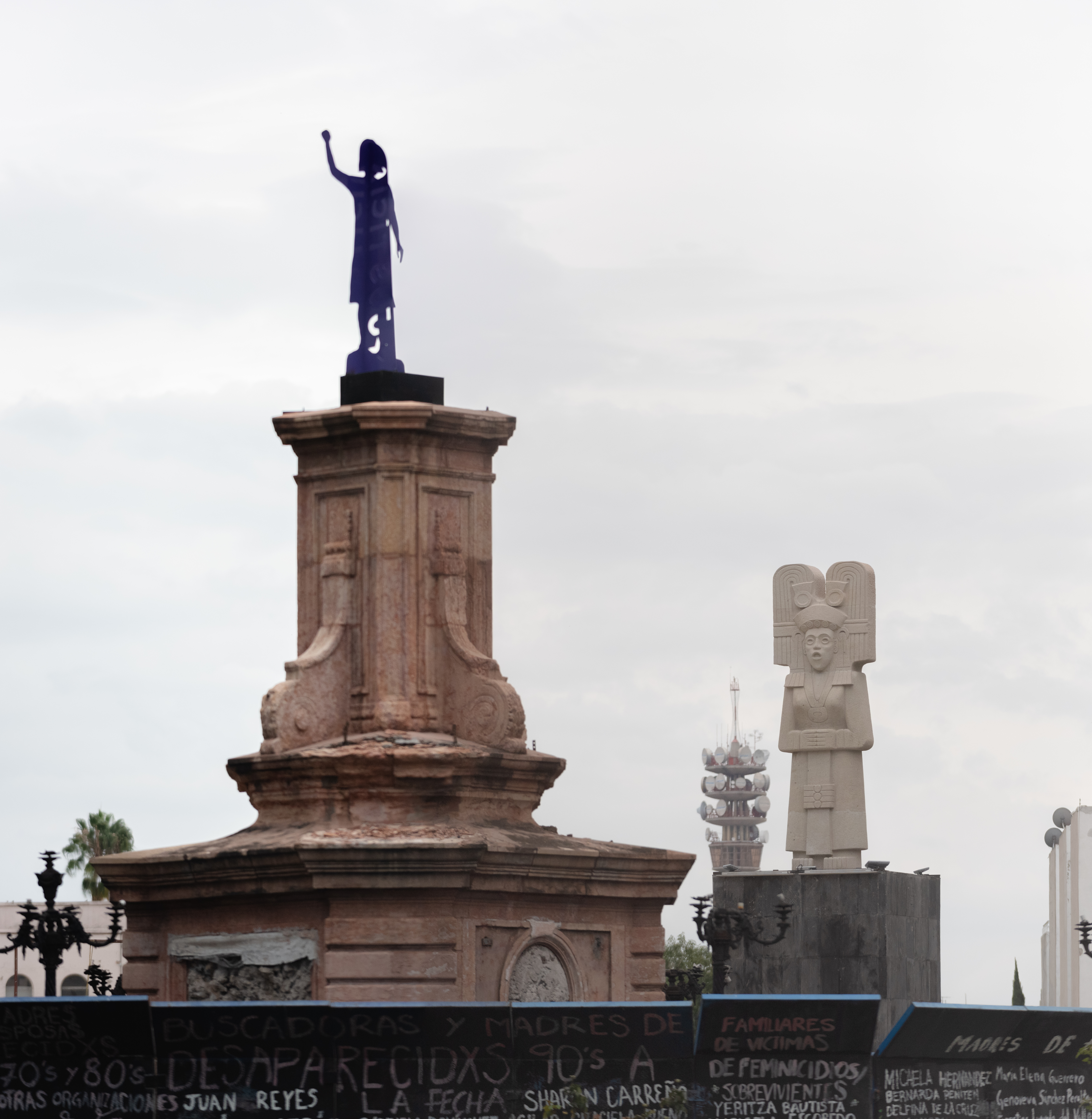
Justicia and The Young Woman of Amajac placed on their respective pedestals in 2023.

== See also ==
- 2021 in art
- Antimonumenta (Mexico City), another feminist work in the city
- Feminist art
