= The Young Woman of Amajac =

Pre-Hispanic sculpture in Mexico

- La joven de Amajac
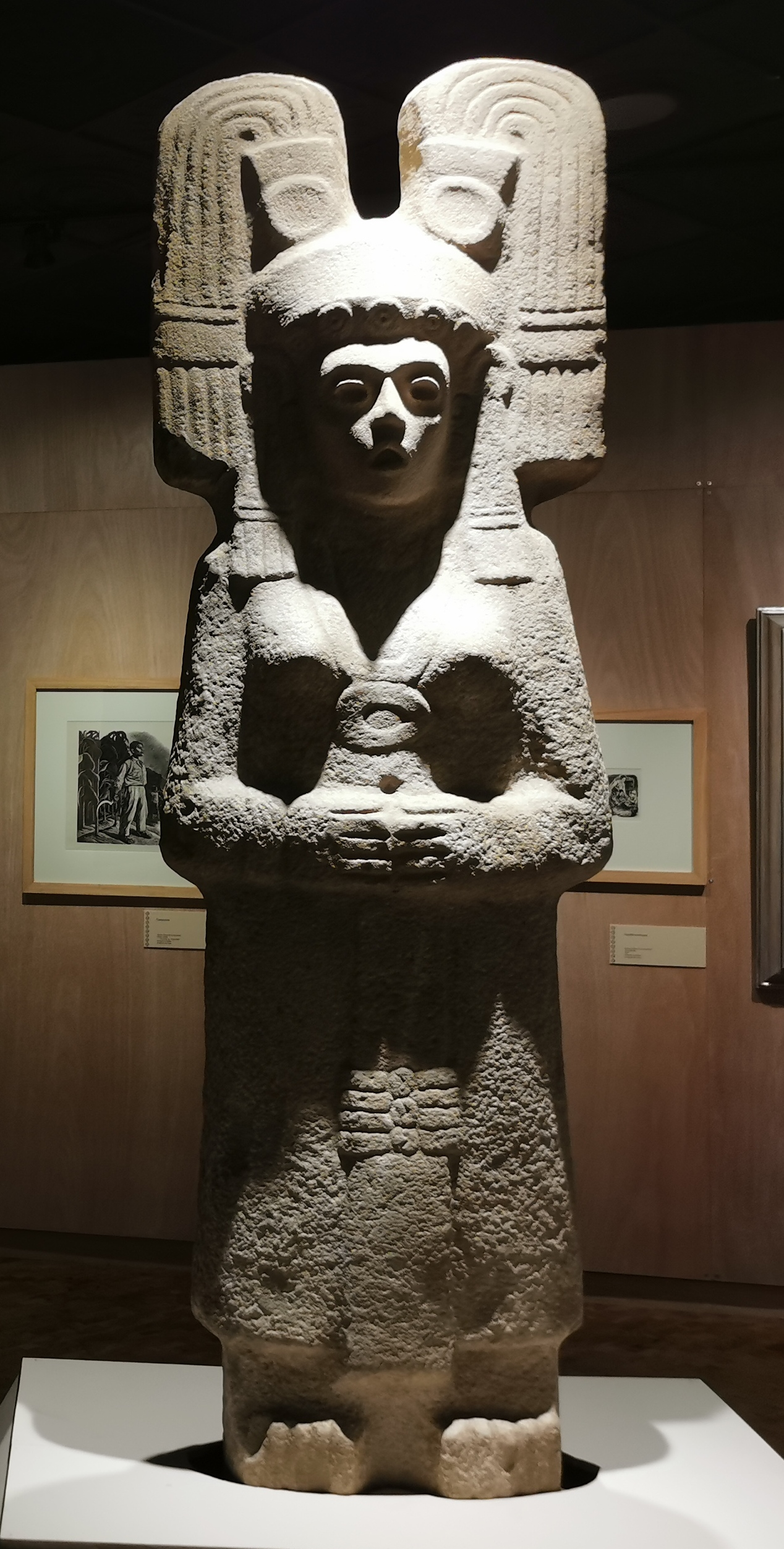
- Material: Limestone
- Length: 60 cm (24 in)
- Height: 2 m (6 ft 7 in)
- Width: 25 cm (9.8 in)
- Created: Postclassic period (c. 1451–1521 CE)
- Discovered: 1 January 2021; Hidalgo Amajac, Álamo Temapache Municipality, Veracruz
- Discovered by: Local farmers
- Present location: Recinto Cultural Hidalgo Amajac
- Coordinates: 20°54′15″N 97°37′42″W
- Culture: Huastec

Location
- Recinto Cultural Hidalgo Amajac

The Young Woman of Amajac (Spanish: La joven de Amajac, pronounced [aˈmaxak] in Spanish) is a pre-Hispanic sculpture depicting an Indigenous woman. It was discovered by farmers in January 2021 in the Huasteca region, in eastern Mexico.

It is not known who it may symbolize, although researchers consider it to be a goddess or a ruler. The piece was on temporary display at Mexico City's National Museum of Anthropology and, since August 2022, been on display in the town where it was found, in Álamo Temapache Municipality, Veracruz.

A replica of the sculpture was slated to officially replace Monument to Christopher Columbus along Mexico City's Paseo de la Reforma, which was removed in 2020 but it was later occupied by the Glorieta de las mujeres que luchan, a space for protest against violence suffered by women in the country set up by feminists in 2021. Instead, the replica was installed on an adjacent traffic island.

== History ==
The sculpture is estimated to have been created between 1450 and 1521, during the postclassic period. It is a 2-meter (6 ft 7 in) tall, 60-centimeter (24 in) wide, and 25-centimeter (9.8 in) thick limestone artwork that depicts a woman wearing a blouse and ankle-length skirt. She appears to wear jewelry, including circular pendants known as "oyohualli". Her eyes are hollow indicating that they probably had stones in them. At her bare feet, there is a stake that allowed the sculpture to be placed in the ground upright.

=== Discovery ===
A group of farmers discovered the sculpture on 1 January 2021 while preparing to till the land in a citrus field in the town of Hidalgo Amajac, near the city of Álamo, in the municipality of Álamo Temapache, Veracruz. It is not known whom it is supposed to represent. The National Institute of Anthropology and History (INAH) considered it was similar to the Huastec's fertility goddess, Tlazōlteōtl, but did not dismiss it as being a representation of a member of the elite. It is the first sculpture of its kind to be found near the Tuxpan River.

According to Alejandra Frausto Guerrero, the head of the nation's Secretariat of Culture, the find is significant. Likely representing an important female ruler, it supports the idea of women's participation in the political life of the Huastecs.

=== Exhibition ===
The Young Woman of Amajac was presented at the National Museum of Anthropology of Mexico (MNA) for the exhibition La Grandeza de México (The Greatness of Mexico). The statue temporarily left the museum as it was sent back to Hidalgo Amajac, where it received a tribute in a cultural festival organized by its inhabitants. There, the sculpture symbolically inaugurated the Recinto Cultural de Hidalgo Amajac (Cultural Precinct of Hidalgo Amajac), where it has been permanently exhibited since it left the museum in August 2022. Municipality officials will place a mural depicting the history of the town and its archaeological discoveries.

In November 2021, the Secretariat of Culture and the INAH filmed and published a documentary entitled La Joven de Amajac, una mujer entre el naranjal (The Young Woman of Amajac, a Woman Among the Orange Groves).

== The Young Woman of Amajac II ==
On 30 May 2023, a smaller sculpture similar to The Young Woman of Amajac was found in Álamo Temapache Municipality as a result of road construction. The Young Woman of Amajac II is 1.54-meter (5 ft 1 in) tall with a width of 55 cm (22 in) and a max thickness of 19 cm (7.5 in). It weighs between 200 kg (440 lb) to 250 kg (550 lb).

After the discovery, INAH researchers did not rule out the possibility that it could represent another ruler and that a pre-Columbian site might have existed in the area. Days later, archaeologists found several burials of people who inhabited the area between 1100 and 1200 CE.

== Modern replica ==
The Young Woman of Amajac
- La joven de Amajac
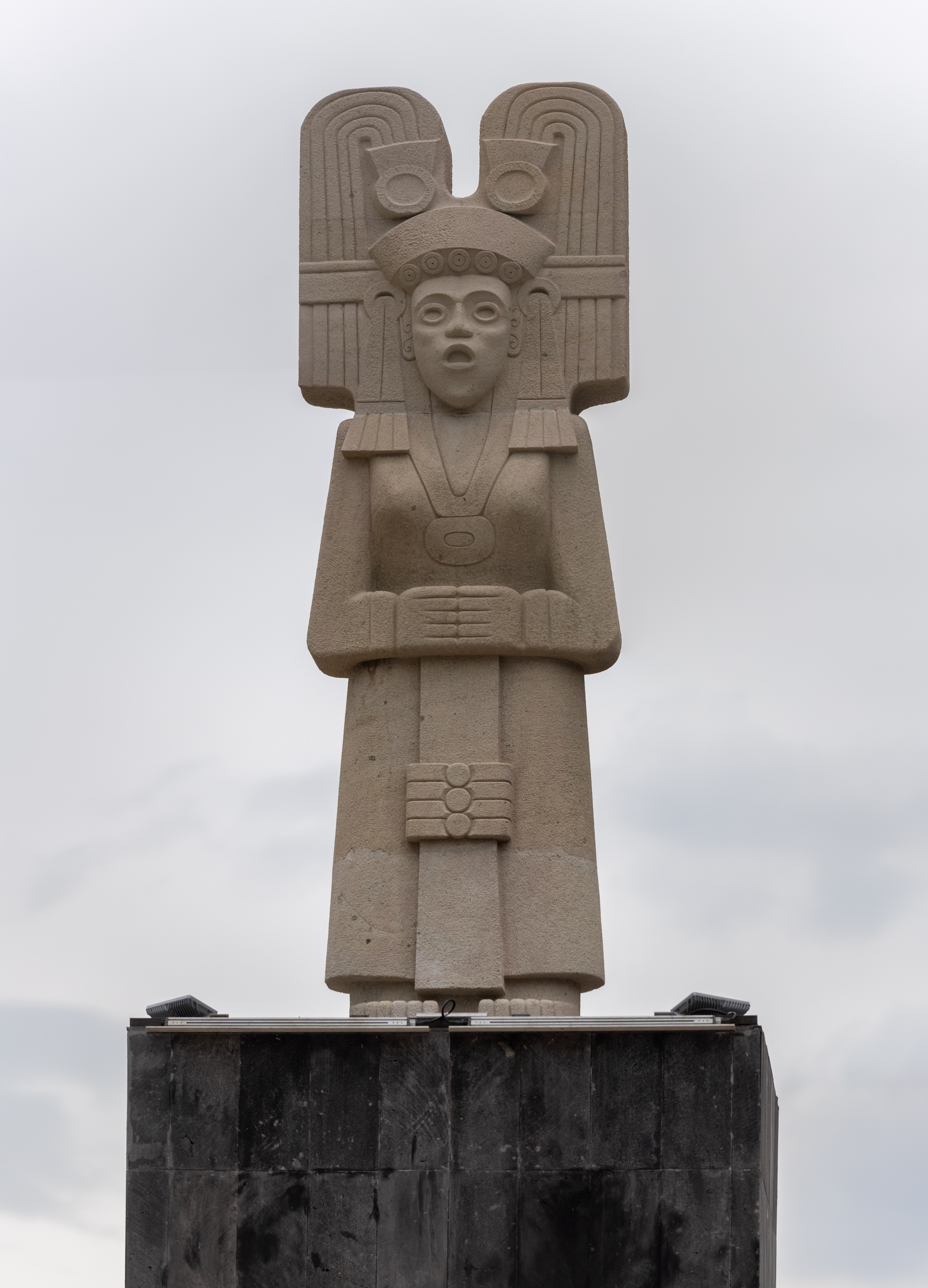
- The sculpture in 2023
- Location
- Location: Mexico City, Mexico
- Coordinates: 19°25′58.3″N 99°09′16″W
- Height: 4.5 m (15 ft)
- Weight: 12 t (12 long tons; 13 short tons)
- Opening date: 23 July 2023
- Dedicated to: Indigenous Mexican women

=== History and installation ===
The government of Mexico City, headed by Claudia Sheinbaum, announced on 12 October 2021 that a replica of The Young Woman of Amajac was intended to officially replace the Monument to Christopher Columbus, at a roundabout along Mexico City's Paseo de la Reforma. The Columbus statue was removed in October 2020 by the local government under the premise of restoration. Later, city officials proposed installing Tlalli, an Olmec colossal head by Pedro Reyes, after receiving 5,000 signatures from Indigenous women who asked to "decolonize Paseo de la Reforma". Reyes's proposal was not well-received and was canceled by the city in September 2021.

Days after the announcement of Tlalli, feminists intervened in the traffic circle and installed the Glorieta de las mujeres que luchan, where Justicia, a purple sculpture of a woman raising her fist in the air, is placed on its empty pedestal. The area developed into a site of protest against violence suffered by women in the country. The attempted removal led to several conflicts between government officials and demonstrators. Following months of discussion, in February 2023, Sheinbaum declared that both the Glorieta de las mujeres que luchan and The Young Woman of Amajac would coexist in the traffic circle, while the Columbus sculpture would be relocated to the National Museum of the Viceroyalty, in Tepotzotlán, State of Mexico.

The sculpture for The Young Woman of Amajac was originally planned as a 6-meter (20 ft) tall work whose expected cost was 7.5 million pesos (approximately 376,000 U.S. dollars). It was intended to stand on top of the 19th century neoclassical pedestal created for the Columbus statue. Due to the lack of consensus on the organization of the roundabout, Martí Batres, Sheinbaum's interim successor, announced that The Young Woman of Amajac would stand on its own plinth in an adjacent traffic island. Batres inaugurated the sculpture on 23 July 2023, adding that, "Yes we could [...] from today it becomes a roundabout for the anti-colonialist struggle of indigenous peoples, communities and women".

On 12 October 2023, Columbus Day – locally known as Day of the Pluricultural Nation – the Mexico City government renamed the adjacent Metrobús stations (Lines 4 and 7) and their pictograms replaced the silhouette of the Columbus statue with that of The Young Woman of Amajac.

=== Description ===
The Young Woman of Amajac is a 4.5-meter (15 ft) tall work that weighs 12 metric tons (12 long tons; 13 short tons). INAH workers made the 3D design for the sculpture. Stonemasons from Chimalhuacán, State of Mexico, sculpted it with a volcanic rock known as púlpito del diablo, obtained from a mine in Amecameca, State of Mexico. The plinth is made of black basalt. The sculpture is divided into four sections and it has an internal metallic skeleton whose purpose is to cushion earthquakes, which impact the city commonly.

=== Reception ===
In 2022, during a meeting about the placement of The Young Woman of Amajac and the replacement of Justicia, Indigenous women said they do not identify with a sculpture of a privileged woman.

The installers of the Glorieta de las mujeres que luchan said, "Last night they placed the surprised Young Woman of Amajac, the cold stone statue that represents the former head of government[;] we cannot deny that they got that right". Blanca González Rosas wrote for Proceso that the replica of The Young Woman of Amajac "generates a visual dissonance that alters the landscape balance of the ring road" due to the size; its location "is a space of no practical use"; that being a copy, "its value as [...] an artwork is totally null"; and she regretted it creates a "differentiation of women by race and rank". González concluded her review by saying that the project "is perceived as a political simulation in which the indigenous identity is only a copy".

Indalí Pardillo, congresswoman of Mexico City and then-President of the Commission on Cultural Rights of the city, considered that the installation marked a "before and after in the [local] history", since the avenue contains multiple symbols of "subjugation, plundering and colonial domination".

== See also ==
- 2021 in archaeology
- Indigenismo in Mexico
