= La Capresse des Colonies =

1861 sculpture by Charles-Henri-Joseph Cordier

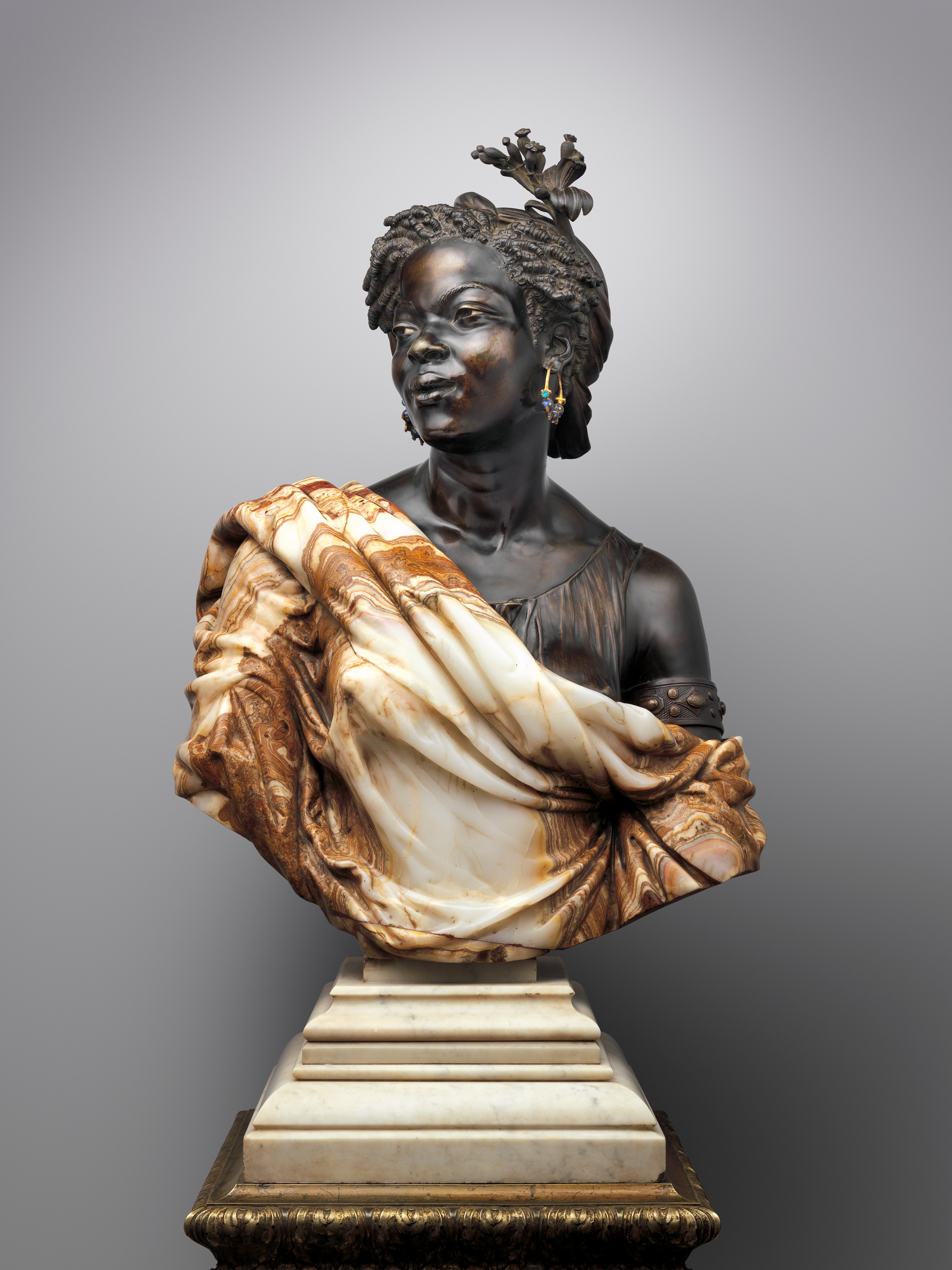
- Artist: Charles-Henri-Joseph Cordier
- Year: 1861
- Medium: Onyx, marble, bronze and gilt bronze, marble
- Location: Metropolitan Museum of Art; New York City

La Capresse des Colonies is a mid-19th century sculpture by French sculptor Charles-Henri-Joseph Cordier. Sculpted from Algerian marble and adorned with bronze and onyx, using polychromy, the statue was crafted in the years following the 1848 emancipation of slaves in the French Empire, an edict which greatly inspired Cordier. It is part of a pair with The Jewish Woman of Algiers. Both sculptures are in the collection of the Metropolitan Museum of Art.
