= Monument to Christopher Columbus (Charles Cordier) =

Statue in Mexico City, Mexico

- Monumento a Colón (Spanish)
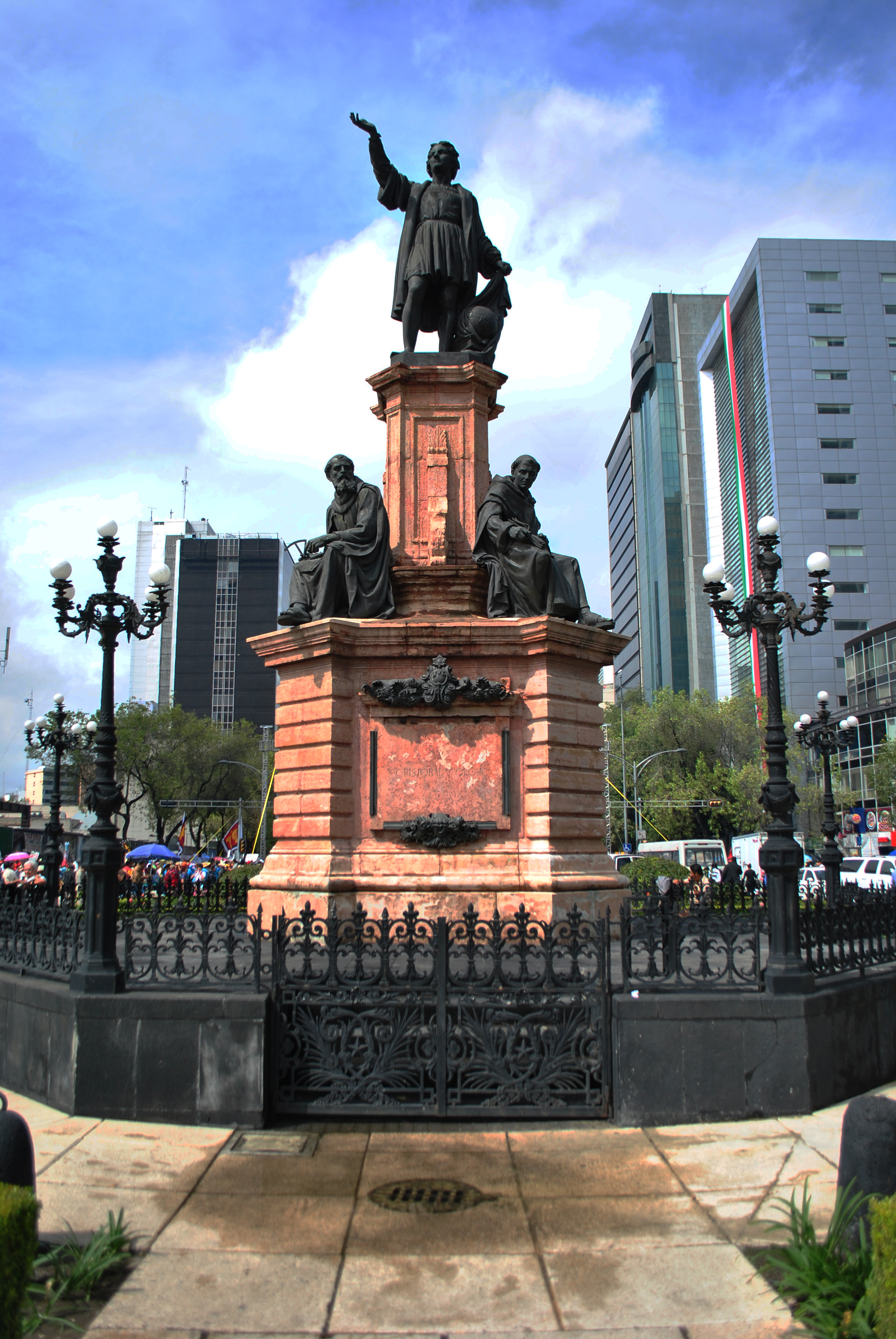
- The monument in its former location in 2013.
- Artist: Charles Cordier
- Year: 1877
- Subject: Christopher Columbus
- Location: Mexico City, Mexico; 19°25′59″N 99°09′17″W

The Monument to Christopher Columbus (Spanish: Monumento a Colón) is a statue by French sculptor Charles Cordier first dedicated in 1877. It was originally located on a major traffic roundabout along Mexico City's Paseo de la Reforma, and was removed on 10 October 2020 in advance of protests.

Following months of discussion, the city government announced that Glorieta de las mujeres que luchan and The Young Woman of Amajac monuments would coexist on the roundabout, while the Columbus sculpture would be relocated to the National Museum of the Viceroyalty in Tepotzotlán.

== Description ==
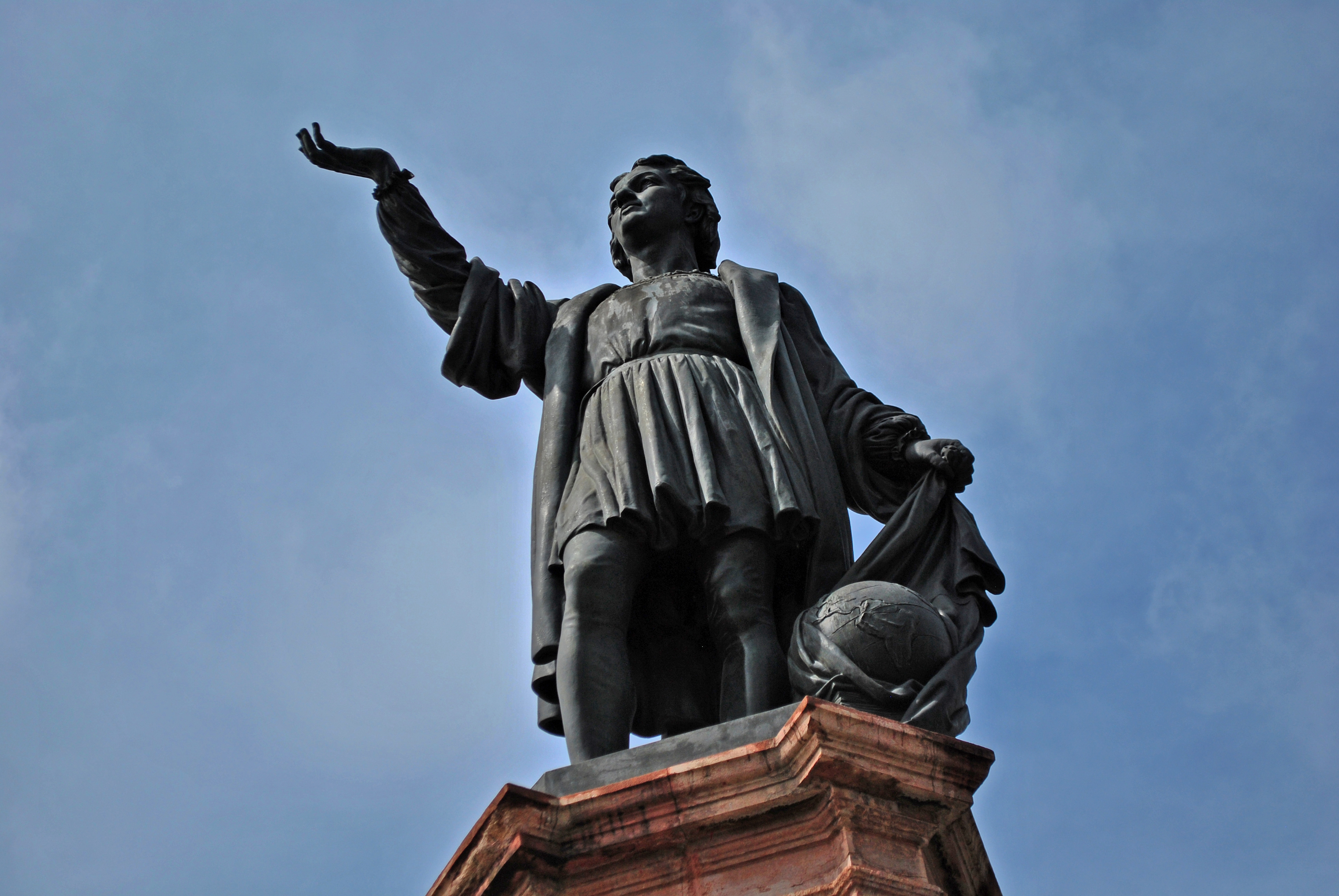
Detail showing Columbus lifting a veil from the globe

On the monument's pedestal were two bas-reliefs, one depicting Christopher Columbus's arrival in the New World and the other, the construction of a church. On the corners of the pedestal were statues of friars, depicted in a seated position, said to be those who were important to the early history of Mexico including Franciscan Pedro de Gante, the first to evangelize Mexico's indigenous population, and Dominican Bartolomé de las Casas; and Antonio de Marchena and Diego de Deza, who aided Columbus in Spain.

As with "almost all the [Columbus] monuments, the gift or inspiration of Europeans or Europeans of mixed descent, include some reference to religion." In Mexico, where anticlericalism and suppression of the power of the Catholic Church had embroiled Mexico in a civil war and a foreign intervention during the nineteenth-century liberal Reform, the Columbus statue's combination of religious iconography and symbolic embodiment of European conquest and domination, has made the statue a target of protesters. One scholar suggests that Columbus "is portrayed as a conqueror, or even a conjurer, for he plucks a veil from the globe he holds."

== History ==
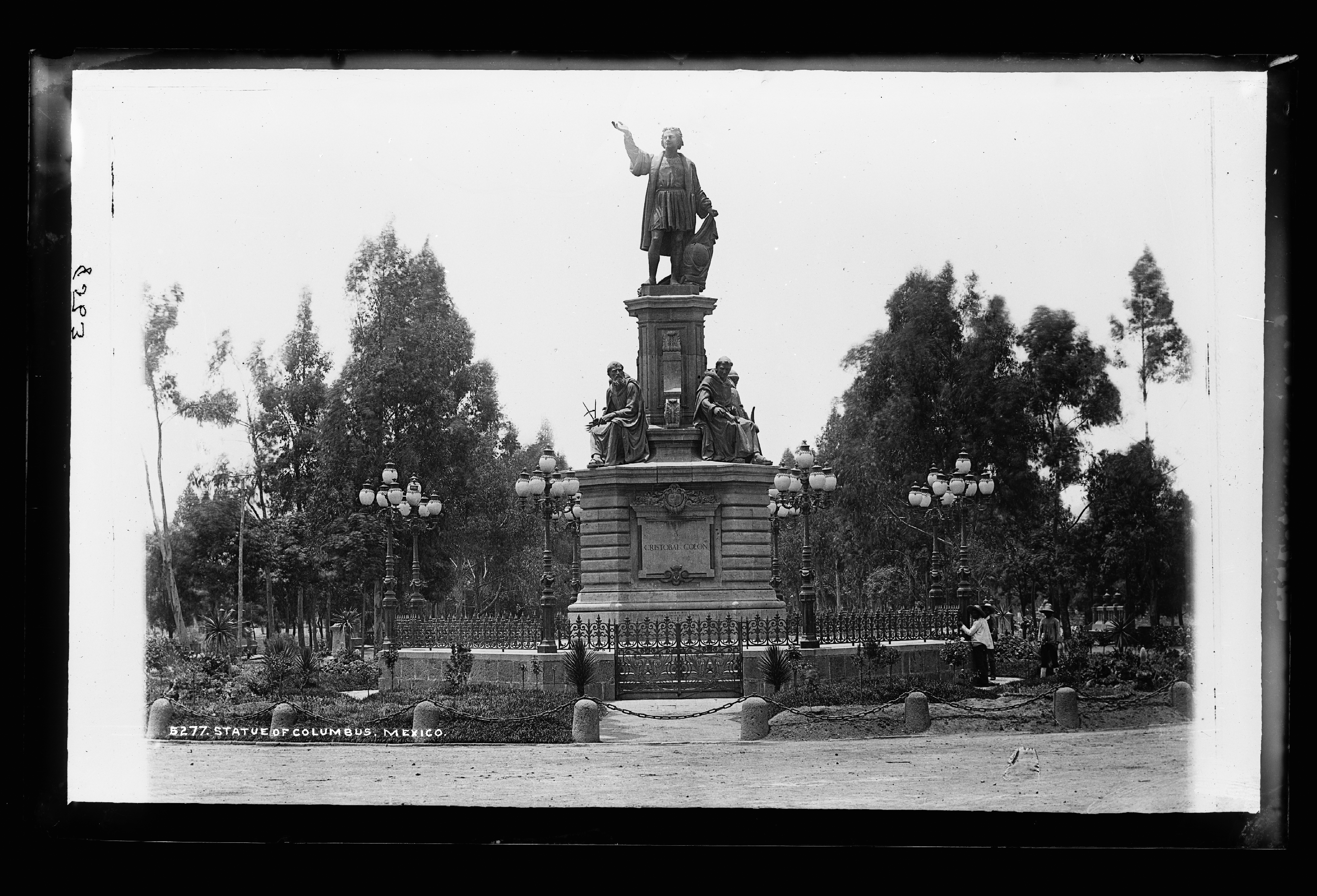
Early photo of monument.

The statue was part of a plan to embellish the major thoroughfare with statues of persons of historical significance to Mexico. The work was a gift to the capital of the entrepreneur, Antonio Escandón, a member of a wealthy, conservative Mexican family and who had supported Emperor Maximilian, built the Mexico City-Veracruz railway with the help of French investments and British engineers. The railway linked the inland capital with its main east coast port. Escandón "decided to commemorate the era of the railroad in Mexico with a monument to an equally epochal event, the Discovery of the New World."

In 1873, Escandón commissioned French sculptor Charles Cordier to design and execute the statue, which was shipped to Mexico for installation. The statue was inaugurated almost immediately after liberal General Porfirio Díaz seized the presidency in 1876. The Cordier sculpture has been described as the construction of a monument "manipulated by a Mexican industrialist for greater economic ties with foreign investors." It was originally to be placed in front of the Buenavista train station in Mexico City. The statue had already been commissioned and sculpted in France, arriving in Veracruz in 1875. It was installed in 1877 under the supervision of Mexican engineer, Eleuterio Méndes.

On October 12, 1992, on the occasion of the 500 year anniversary of Columbus' voyage of discovery to America, a series of protests were held in different cities of Mexico. In Mexico City the monument was defaced after a protest led by indigenous groups, unions and punk collectives. The protesters tried toppling the Columbus sculpture by attaching ropes to a Ruta 100 public transport bus but the attempt was frustrated by the Mexico City Police Grenadier Corps. In later demonstrations, the monument was protected in different ways to prevent the toppling of Columbus sculpture.

=== Removal and relocation ===
Before and during the George Floyd protests, anti-racist protestors began to target and remove statues of figures linked to colonialism and slavery. Christopher Columbus' controversial historical reputation led to protestors to topple numerous statues of him installed throughout the Americas. In Mexico City, a demonstration was called on October 12, 2020, to topple the Columbus sculpture. On October 10, 2020, Government of Mexico City removed the Reforma sculpture from the monument due to a previously scheduled restoration by the National Institute of Anthropology and History. The demonstration moved instead to the monument located in Buenavista.

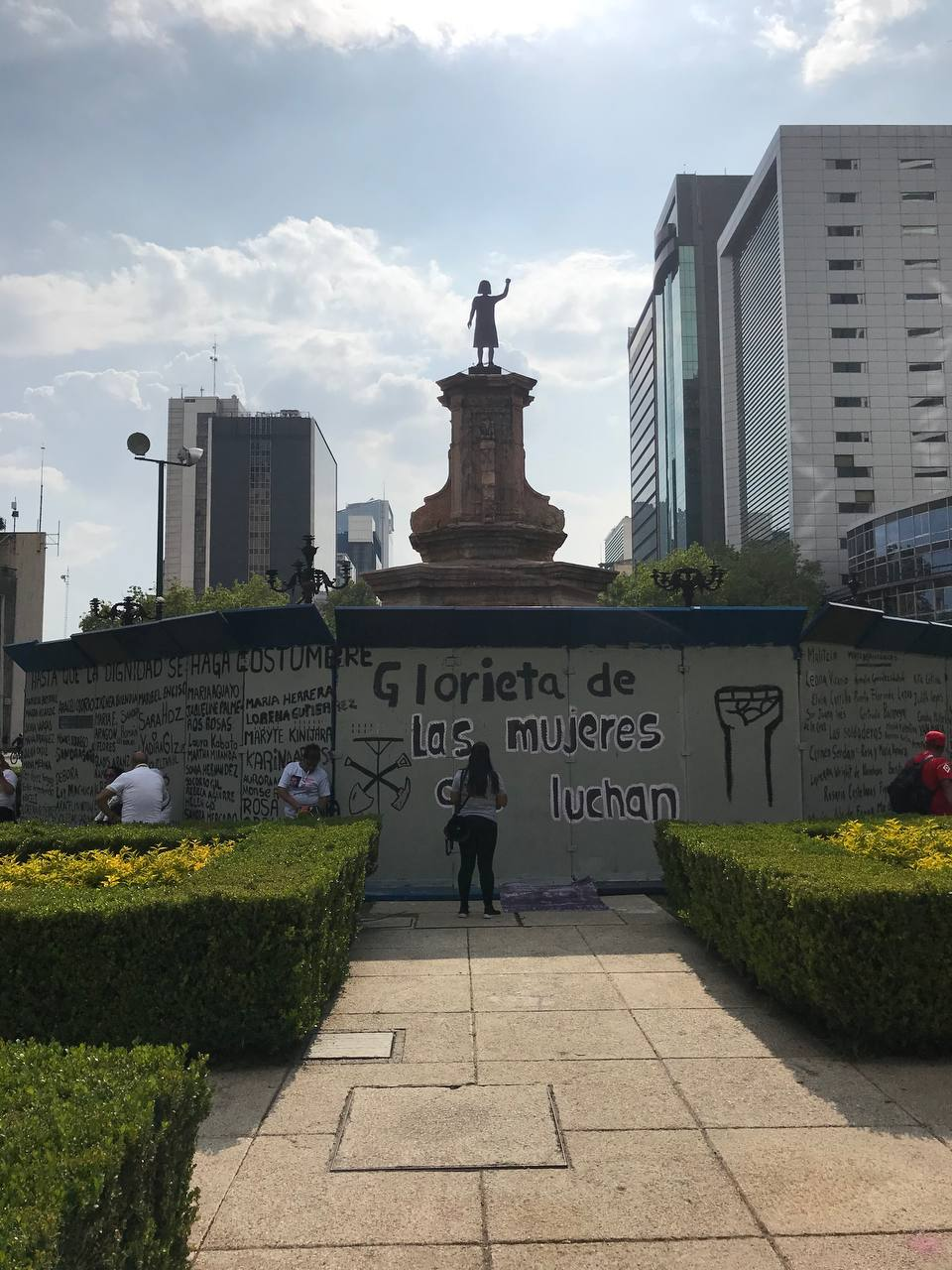
The Glorieta de las mujeres que luchan antimonumenta on September 29, 2021

The government of Mexico City announced that the repositioning or the removal of the sculptures of the monument would be defined after a round of debates that were expected to be held in 2021, in the context of the commemorations of the 500th anniversary of the Fall of Tenochtitlan. On September 5, 2021, the city announced that the monument would not be returned to Reforma Avenue and it would be relocated to Parque América, in Polanco. Instead, Tlali, a statue of a woman from the Olmec civilization by sculptor Pedro Reyes, was announced to be set at the site. By September 14, after a petition signed by "more than 350 people from the world of culture... was sent to the mayor, against Reyes' participation in the project", Reyes was deemed "inadmissible" as the artist. Mexico City Mayor Claudia Sheinbaum announced that a committee would decide on a replacement artist.

On September 25, 2021, different feminist collectives and families of victims installed an antimonumenta, and symbolically renamed it as the Glorieta de las mujeres que luchan, mainly decorated by the Antimonumenta Vivas Nos Queremos sculpture. On 12 October, Sheinbaum proposed an enlarged copy of The Young Woman of Amajac to replace the statue of Columbus. The statue of Columbus was expected to be relocated during the second half of 2022. The restoration concluded by the end of 2022.

Due to the lack of agreement as to which sculpture would replace Columbus, discussions were held during 2022. By 2023, the city government announced that the statue of Columbus would be relocated to the National Museum of the Viceroyalty, in Tepotzotlán, State of Mexico, while the Antimonumenta Vivas Nos Queremos and The Young Woman of Amajac sculptures would coexist on the roundabout. As of October 2024, the sculpture remains stored in a warehouse.

In 2025, President Sheinbaum stated that monument to Columbus was already installed, but she did not specify its location.

== See also ==
- List of monuments and memorials to Christopher Columbus
