= Tlali =

Sculpture by Pedro Reyes

- Tlali installed at the Geffen Galleries in the Los Angeles County Museum of Art
- Artist: Pedro Reyes
- Year: 2026
- Medium: Volcanic rock
- Dimensions: 5.5 m (18 ft)
- Weight: 80 t (79 long tons; 88 short tons)
- Location: Los Angeles County Museum of Art, Los Angeles

Tlali (Nahuatl languages: Tlalli: land or earth; [ˈt͡ɬalːi]) is a sculpture depicting the face of an Indigenous woman by the Mexican contemporary artist Pedro Reyes. It was installed at a wing of the Los Angeles County Museum of Art (LACMA), which opened in April 2026.

Originally, a similar large-scale version depicting a colossal head was planned to replace the Monument to Christopher Columbus on Mexico City's Paseo de la Reforma in March 2022, while a smaller version was exhibited at the New York City's Lisson Gallery in May 2021. The version intended for Paseo de la Reforma was inspired by the Olmec colossal heads, and was conceived to honor 500 years of the resistance of Indigenous women. The government of Mexico City, headed by Claudia Sheinbaum, announced in October 2020 that the monument to Columbus would be removed from its plinth, officially for restoration. She subsequently announced that a public consultation would be held to determine the statue's future, but it ultimately did not take place. In September 2021, Sheinbaum announced that Tlali would replace the monument to Columbus following a request from 5,000 Indigenous women to decolonize the avenue.

The announcement of Tlali, its design and name, and the selection of Reyes as its sculptor received mixed reactions, including from Indigenous people. The decision to remove the Columbus statue also generated controversy and became part of the debate surrounding the sculpture. Following criticism, Sheinbaum said that a committee would determine the project's future, and a month later she stated that a copy of The Young Woman of Amajac would be placed there instead. However, feminists intervened the empty Columbus' plinth and installed their own proposal, the Glorieta de las mujeres que luchan. Although the Mexico City government never formally declared the Tlali project canceled, journalists and scholars have generally regarded it as such.

The version installed at the LACMA lacks several features present in the original Mexico City proposal and, according to the museum, differs in both purpose and meaning. Nevertheless, it received criticism linked to the earlier project in Mexico City.

== Background: Mexico City project ==
=== Inception ===
In the context of the commemorations of the 500th anniversary of the Fall of Tenochtitlan, the capital of the Aztec Empire and present-day Mexico City, the city government announced several changes and celebrations to take place in 2021.

A monument honoring the Genoese explorer Christopher Columbus was located on a roundabout along Paseo de la Reforma, in the borough of Cuauhtémoc. The statue was removed on 10 October 2020, prior to an attempted demonstration to topple it two days later, on Columbus Day. According to the city government, it was removed amid a series of restoration works carried out by the National Institute of Anthropology and History (INAH). The head of government of the city, Claudia Sheinbaum, said public debates would be held in 2021 to determine the future of the monument. On the other hand, the Committee for Monuments and Artistic Works in Public Spaces (Comité de Monumentos y Obras Artísticas en Espacios Públicos, COMAEP) is responsible for evaluating, approving, and overseeing the installation, relocation, and conservation of monuments and public artworks in Mexico City.

On 5 September 2021, International Indigenous Women's Day, Sheinbaum announced that the statue of Columbus would not be returned to its original site. Instead, she proposed its relocation to Parque América, in Polanco. She added that a collosal head sculpture named Tlali would replace the statue of Columbus, to honor 500 years of the resistance of Indigenous women, and that the relocation was not intended to "erase history" but to "deliver social justice". She also mentioned that the decision was taken after receiving 5,000 signatures from Indigenous women who called to "decolonize Paseo de la Reforma".

=== Description ===
Artist's rendering proposed to be placed on Paseo de la Reforma.

Tlali is a sculpture by the Mexican artist Pedro Reyes. He explained that the government had chosen him because there were few sculptors in the country specializing in monumental stonework and that the project had to be completed before March 2022.

Tlali was planned to be made of volcanic rock and was being sculpted in three workshops located in Iztapalapa, Chimalhuacán, and Coyoacán by women artisans and sculptors. In Coyoacán, where Reyes also lives, 150 stone blocks were produced for the creation of the sculpture, each measuring 75 centimeters (30 in) in height and weighing 2 metric tons (2.0 long tons; 2.2 short tons). This division facilitates transportation.

Reyes felt honored to be selected to sculpt it because he believes there are no monuments in the country honoring Indigenous women, who "have supported the country". The sculpture's name was taken from the Nahuatl word tlalli, meaning "land" or "earth". He stated that the sculpture reflected the common association of the earth with "Mother Earth" rather than "Father Earth".

The sculpture was based on the art of the Olmecs, a pre-Columbian civilization that developed during the Mesoamerican Preclassic Era. Reyes was inspired by the Olmec colossal heads and said he had difficulty transforming Tlali into a female figure because the original heads depicted men.

Tlali was projected to be 6.5 meters (21 ft) high, supported by an additional 2.5 m (8 ft 2 in) tezontle base. Its diameter would have been 5 m (16 ft) with an approximate weight of 150 metric tons (150 long tons; 170 short tons). The eyes were inspired by those of a jaguar, and the lips were modeled on two snakes. For the hair, a pair of braids that converge at the occipital region were chosen to form a symbol of Nahui Ollin, the Earthquake Sun. According to Reyes, he first designed the figure to have a bun, but anthropologists told him that pre-Hispanic cultures used braids that imitated the appearance of ears of ergots.

=== Reception ===
The announcement, the proposed design and name, the selection of Reyes as sculptor, and the removal of the Columbus statue without prior public discussion drew polarized reactions. Mexican president Andrés Manuel López Obrador supported the decision to install Tlali. Similarly, local representatives and senators from Morena – the ruling party of Mexico, of which Sheinbaum and López Obrador are members – endorsed the project. Congresswoman Alejandra Méndez Vicuña said the sculpture celebrated "Indigenous peoples and their women". For Representative Guadalupe Chávez Contreras, Tlali promoted "justice and recognition for all Indigenous women". Senator César Cravioto Romero said the project sought to change the mindset of Mexicans, as it challenges the notion that foreign things are better.

==== Removal of the Columbus statue ====
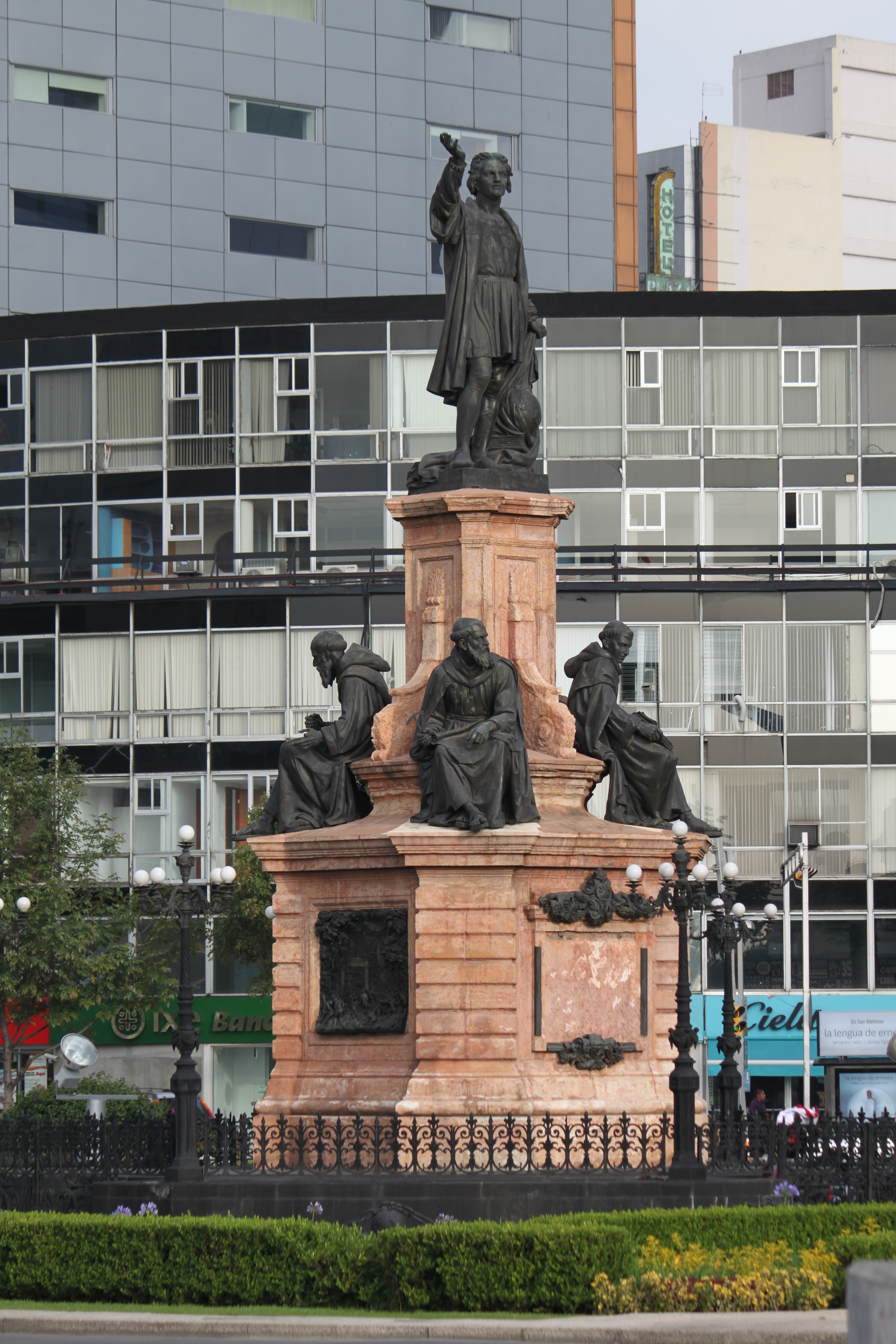
The monument to Christopher Columbus in 2013

Regarding the removal of the Columbus monument, several commentators, including Reyes, noted that there had been previous attempts to topple it, including in 1992 by Indigenous groups, and that its removal aided its preservation and maintenance. For Cuauhtémoc Medina González, then curator at the Museo Universitario Arte Contemporáneo, the making of Tlali exemplifies the process by which a work of a distinctly Mexican character is created by the government without public consensus, in which an author aligned with the administration in power is asked to reinterpret – in this case – an Indigenous representation, while historical elements are removed to assign them a new meaning favorable to political allies and tourists.

Art historian Angélica Velázquez Guadarrama stated that even during the ruling of Porfirio Díaz – which she described as authoritarian and patriarchal – monuments were installed following consultation processes. Deputy Gibrán Ramírez cited the removal of the Columbus statue as one of what he described as several authoritarian actions performed by Sheinbaum. Journalist Eugenio Fernández Vázquez argued that the government's treatment of the monument reflected what he described as an authoritarian resistance to criticism and proposals from outside the government.

==== Selection of Reyes as sculptor ====
The choice of Reyes as the sculptor received criticism, namely because he is neither a woman nor Indigenous. More than 300 people associated with the arts and cultural sector signed a petition to Sheinbaum requesting the exclusion of Reyes from the project and the creation of a committee composed of women from Indigenous communities to choose a monument to represent them. Reyes said that the creator was not the most important part, as "nobody remembers who made the Statue of Liberty or the Angel of Independence"; instead, it is the artwork what prevails.

==== Indigenist view ====
Other critics perceived Tlali as a work intended to promote state-sponsored indigenismo. Archeologist Sandra Rozenta said the project reminded her of archaeological discoveries in the Gulf of Mexico region in the 1940s, when the Olmec culture came to be regarded as the "mother culture" of Mesoamerica. This interpretation was later adopted by politicians, who used reproductions of Olmec colossal heads in international exhibitions as symbols of a modern nation with a deep and rich cultural past. Josefa Sánchez Contreras, Zoque PhD candidate in Mesoamerican studies, called it an act of "desperate neoindigenism", comparing it to other similar acts carried out by López Obrador during his presidential term, while infrastructure projects elsewhere in the country were being developed on Indigenous lands. Writers Gabriela Jauregui and Luna Marán similarly argued that the government attempted to use Indigenous women as an "accessory", while these are belittled, subjected to violence, silenced, disappeared, or killed for defending their lands.

==== Name and design ====
Tlali's name received commentary, including from Mixe linguist and writer Yásnaya Aguilar, who questioned the Nahuatl name when Olmecs would have spoken Mixe–Zoque languages. She noted an inconsistency in selecting an Olmec woman to represent Indigenous peoples, arguing that, as a pre-Columbian society, the Olmecs do not fit conventional definitions of Indigenous identity, which are often tied to communities that experienced colonization. Aguilar also criticized the generalization of women in public sculpture, contrasting it with the individual recognition given to men. Similarly, researcher Lucía Melgar commented that Tlali represented women as "generic, mute and immobilized". Historian Federico Navarrete said the sculpture exemplified an "essentialist view of Indigenous people as all the same".

==== Counterproposal ====
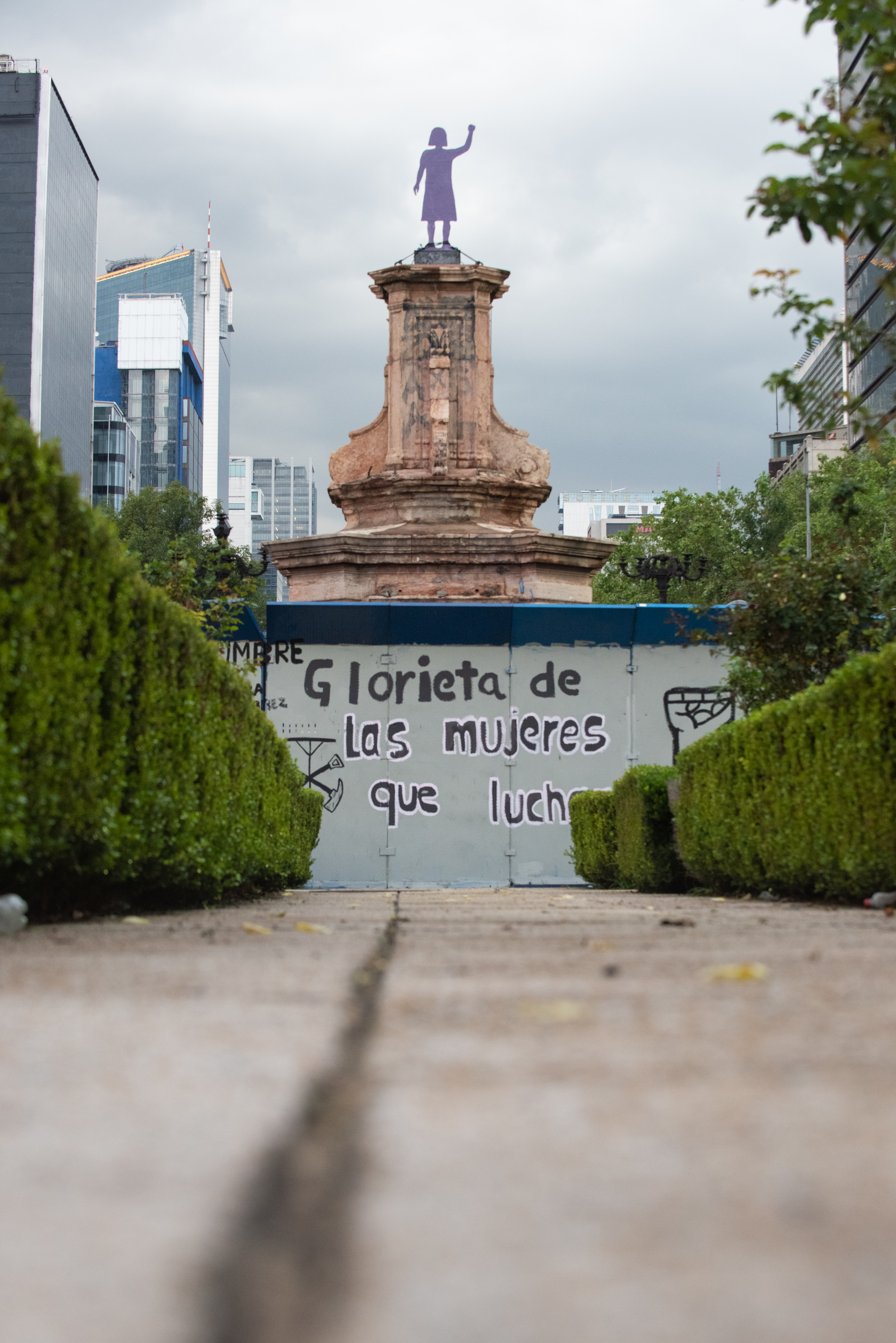
Feminists installed Justicia on the former site of the Columbus monument. It was erected as a form of protest against Tlali.

In response to Tlali, a group of feminists installed Justicia on 25 September 2021, which is a purple wooden statue of a woman with a raised fist on the empty Columbus plinth. They symbolically renamed the intersection the Glorieta de las mujeres que luchan (Women Who Fight Roundabout). Their project arose after the removal of the statue of Columbus but remained in the planning stages until the announcement of Tlali. They made the decision to move forward with the installation after observing what they described as a series of missteps by the authorities.

==== Response by Indigenous women ====
By contrast, a separate meeting brought together 5,000 Indigenous women from communities in the Valley of Mexico, who signed a second petition in support of Tlali, arguing that the project should proceed as an initial step toward "representation and historical justice". The gathering, dubbed La descolonización de Reforma ("The decolonization of Reforma Avenue"), was held at the Museum of Mexico City and presided over by Sheinbaum. It was also attended by senator Jesusa Rodríguez and several Indigenous activists, such as human rights defender Hermelinda Tiburcio, who stated in favor of Tlali:

"Maybe for society this is not important. Perhaps, because of racism or discrimination, it is seen as something ugly or unworthy; but for us, Indigenous women, it means visibility, recognition, and representation".

=== Revocation ===
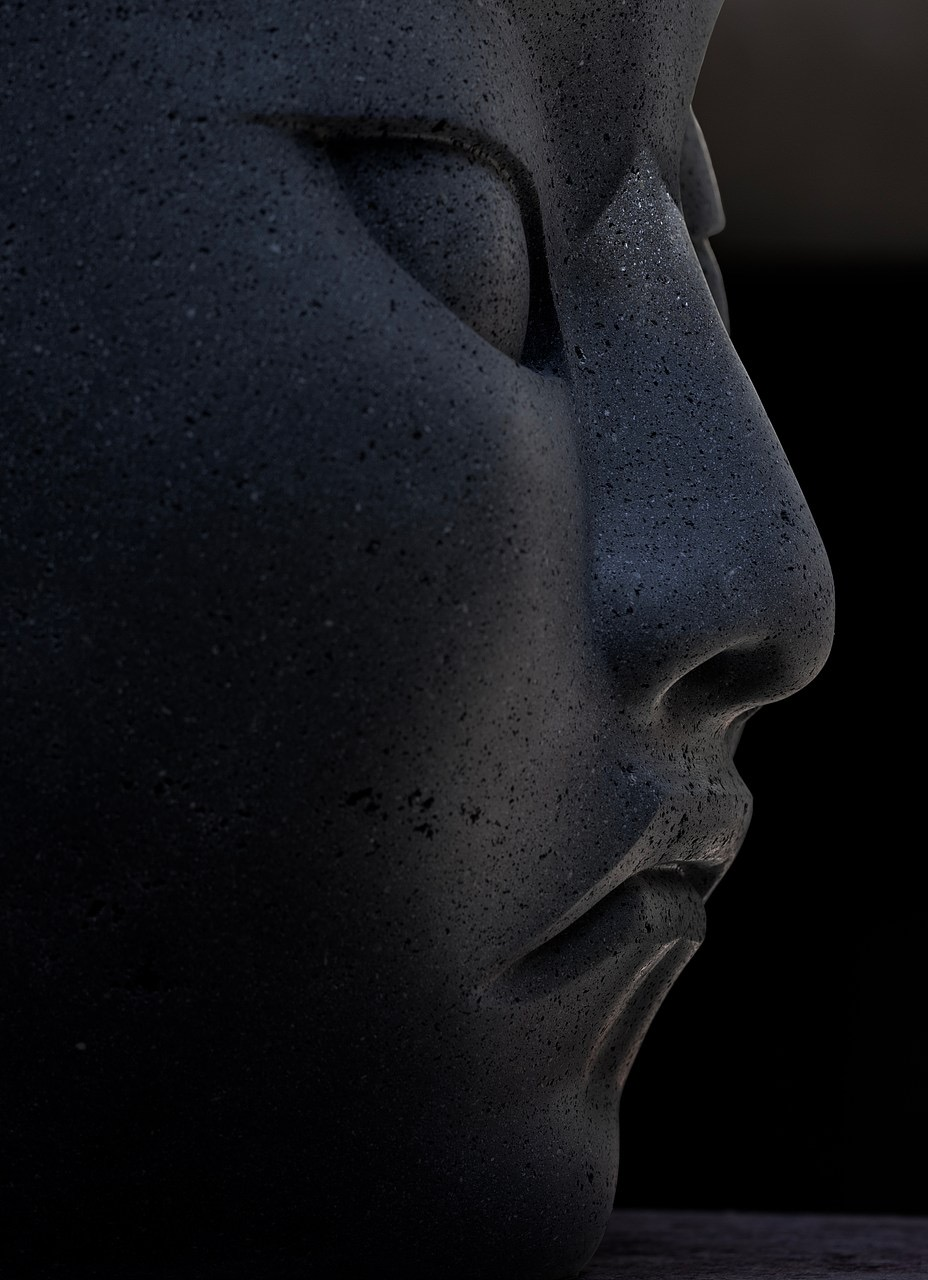
Tlali, photographed in 2026 at Reyes' studio

Due to the controversy, Sheinbaum determined that the COMAEP would determine the most appropriate option to replace Columbus. On 12 October 2021, she announced the installation of an enlarged copy of The Young Woman of Amajac, discovered in January, to replace the statue of Columbus instead of Tlali. For Sheinbaum, the rejection of Tlali in favor of Columbus "revealed the classism and racism present in Mexico City".

Although the government of the city never announced the project's cancellation, journalists and academics have considered it canceled. According to Mexico City's Secretary of Culture, Claudia Curiel de Icaza, the project was still under consideration as of 2022, but The Young Woman of Amajac had higher priority.

== Los Angeles County Museum of Art version ==
In spring 2026, a similar sculpture also named Tlali was installed at the Los Angeles County Museum of Art (LACMA) in California, United States, in the David Geffen Galleries building. The work took two years to complete in Coyoacán, and was installed outdoors for the inauguration of a new building in April 2026. Unlike the original proposal, this version of Tlali depicts only a face rather than a full head. The sculpture is made of volcanic rock, and is 5.5 meters (18 ft) tall, weighing 80 metric tons (79 long tons; 88 short tons).

According to Gillian Glover of Time Out, Tlali is found next to the gift shop, and its colors blend with those of concrete wall and floor. Robin Pogrebin of The New York Times described the place as a selfie spot, an opinion echoed by William Poundstone.

=== Reception in Mexico ===
The newer version of Tlali received criticism from Mexican culture workers because of its connection to the earlier Mexico City proposal. In an open letter, written in English and Spanish and signed by 80 academics, the signatories argued that the LACMA personnel deliberately ignored the controversy surrounding the original project. The academics wrote that Tlali "is a figure likely to have been taken out of Disney's imaginary, reminiscent of Pocahontas and of the 1920s", adding that Reyes showed little interest in critically examining the broad concepts of 'woman' and 'Indigenous'".

Critics mentioned that removal of one letter "l" from the word tlalli was done "to appeal anglophones". A spokesperson for LACMA explained that the name Tlali, spelled with a single "l" rather than two, resulted from a Spanish phonetic transliteration of the word, since "ll" ([ˈtla.ʎi]) in Spanish produces a voiced palatal lateral approximant sound rather than the intended voiced dental and alveolar lateral approximants ([ˈtla.li]).

LACMA authorities answered that the sculptures differed in both purpose and meaning, noting that the newer version lacked the decorative pre-Hispanic elements featured in the Mexico City proposal. However, for María Minera, art critic and one of the academics who opposed the original project, the museum's response minimized "the complaints of hundreds of Mexican women" adding that it suggested that "on [the US] side of the border, we don't hear those cries", since the artwork retained both the name and the essence of the Mexico City proposal. Medina González again opposed the installation, calling it "artistically senseless" because the result reproduced characteristics of official nationalist art produced 80 years earlier. Meanwhile, for writer Irmgard Emmelhainz, who was also among the original opponents of the project, the sculpture "appears to promote old patronizing misunderstandings", addind that Tlali continues reproducing "stylized folkloric abstractions" rooted in "heteropatriarchal colonial" times.

== Other similar works ==
A similar smaller version named Tlali (less than 1 m [3 ft 3 in] in diameter) was exhibited in Lisson Gallery in New York City in May 2021, as part of Reyes's exhibition, also titled Tlali.

Reyes exhibited Citlalli (Nahuatl for star) at the Museum of Contemporary Art in Monterrey in March 2022, which, according to him, discusses decolonization as Tlali does. The following month a six-meter-tall version of Citlalli was exhibited in San Antonio, Texas.

== See also ==
- 2021 in art
- 2026 in art
- Feminist art
- Indigenismo in Mexico
