= Avelina Lésper =

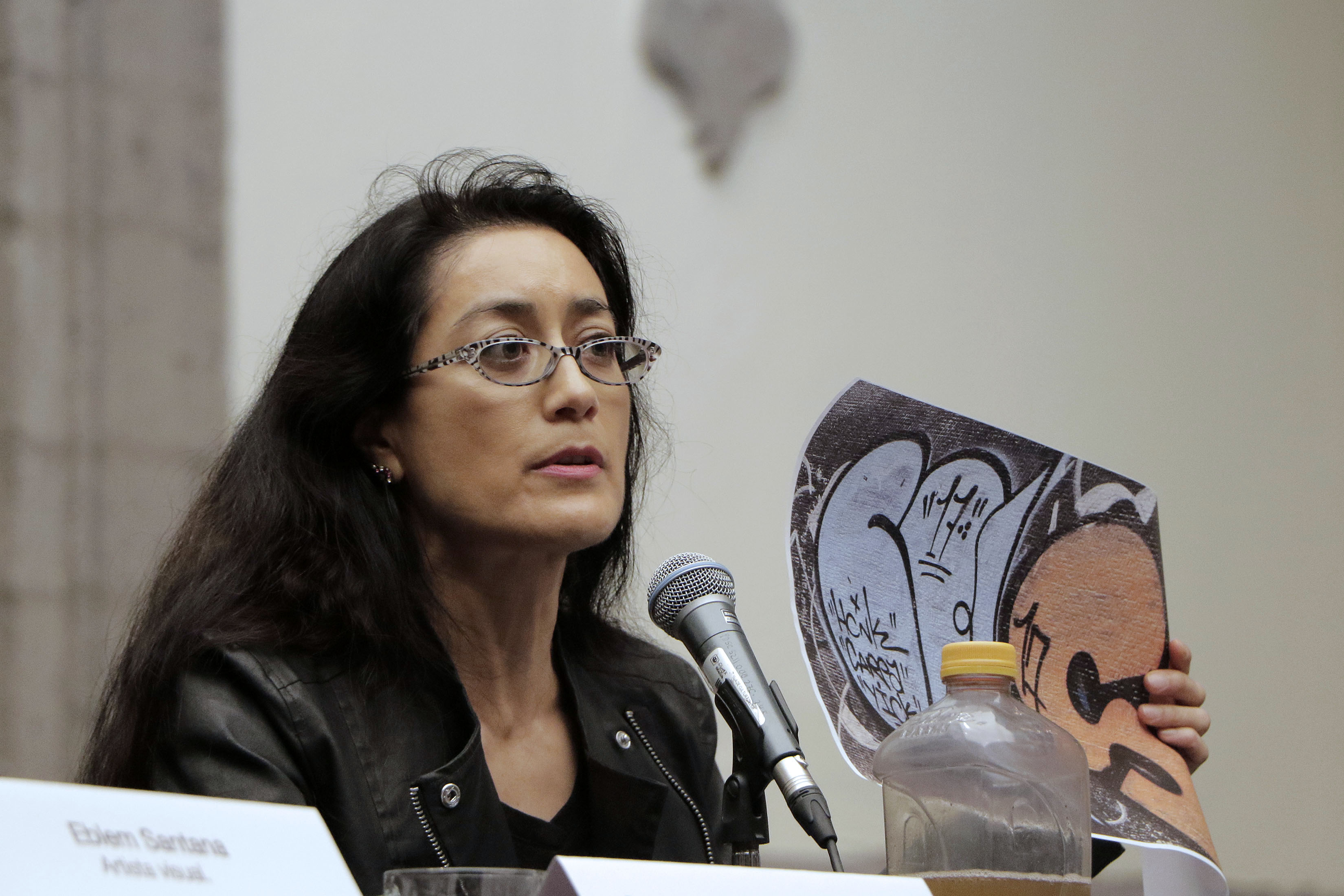
- Avelina Lésper in 2018
- Born: Avelina Lésper; May 5, 1973 (age 53); Ciudad de México, Mexico
- Occupation: Art criticism
- Employer: Milenio
- Website: http://www.avelinalesper.com/

Avelina Lésper (May 5, 1973) is a Mexican writer, historian, columnist, and art critic. She is the author of the book The Fraud of Contemporary Art and is an opponent of the "conceptual" trend of contemporary art, which she calls "vip" (Video art, Installation art and Performance art).

== Studies and career ==
Lésper is a literature graduate from the National Autonomous University of Mexico and a graduate in art history from the Polytechnic University of Łódź in Poland.

She writes articles on her personal website, newspaper, and specialized art magazines; several of these articles have been narrated by herself for TV and on her own YouTube channel. Since 2009, she has published the column "Casta Diva" in the cultural supplement Laberinto of the Mexican newspaper Milenio and has been a recurring contributor to the radio program Dispara Margot, Dispara, since 2014. She is director of the "Milenio Arte" collection, which brings together multiple plastic artists who have created works in Mexico.

Lésper is known mainly for her book The Fraud of Contemporary Art, which contains strong statements that have led to opinions for and against her thesis. The book argues that much of installation, video art, performance and found art is not art, "it's garbage", maintaining that contemporary art is in crisis.

She is seen by many to be a staunch defender of figurative art. However, on several occasions she also recognizes the work of artists such as Mark Rothko, Jackson Pollock, Gabriel Macotela, Manuel Felguérez, among other artists belonging to abstract, non-figurative currents.

== Position regarding contemporary art ==
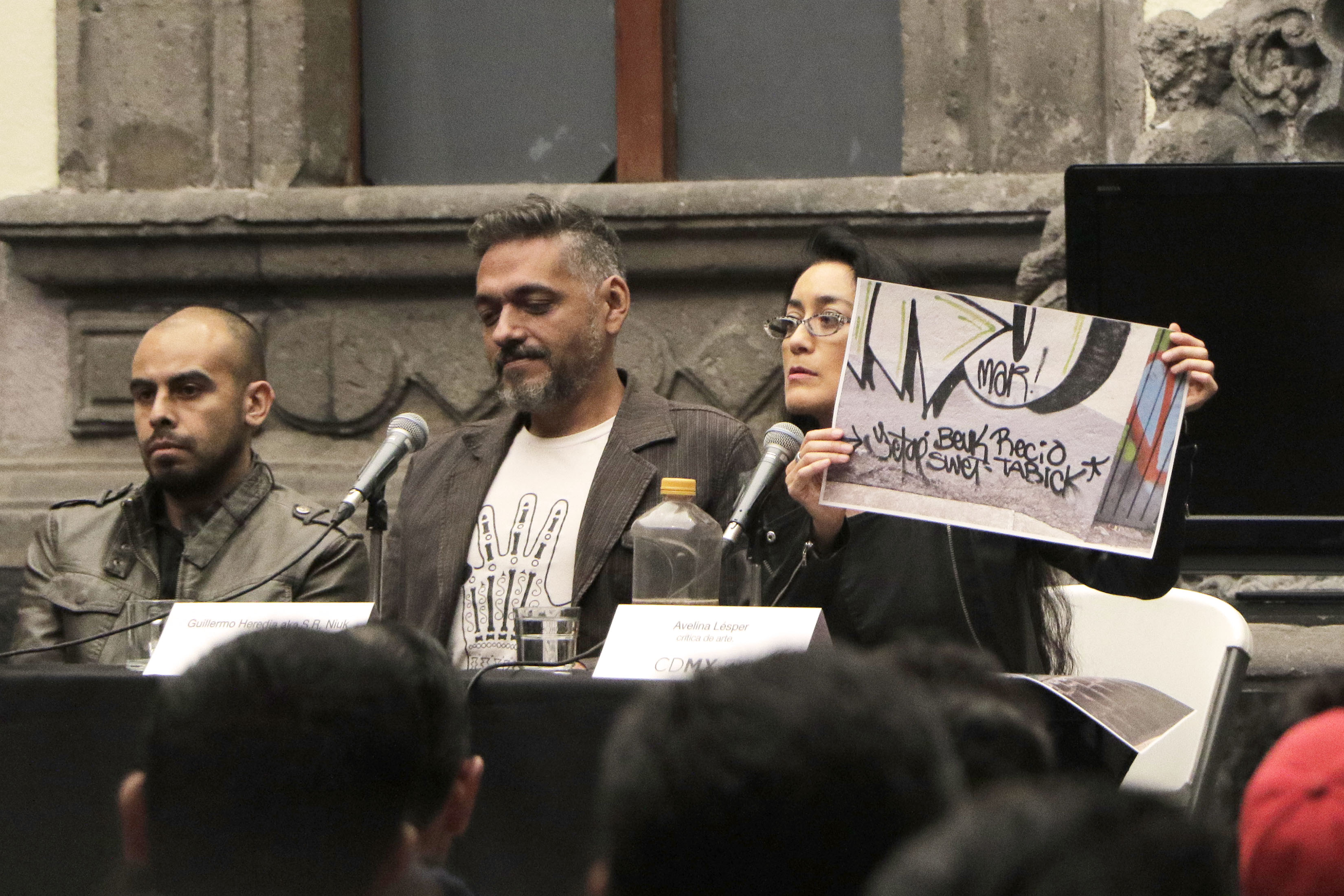
Debate on graffiti at the Mexico City Museum, August 2018.

In July 2018, Avelina Lésper published a photograph on her blog in which she posed next to graffiti located on 4 Poniente Street on the corner of Periférico Sur, near the Sala Ollin Yoliztli in Mexico City; on it could be read the phrase "Avelina Lésper, I don't care a damn!". Critics called on the authors of graffiti to maintain a dialogue about what these interventions imply and what their artistic value is based on, as well as why they should remain on the streets of the city. The debate was called for Saturday, August 4 at the Museum of Mexico City.

During Lésper's interventions, whistles and complaints were heard from the public. At the end of the event, and once outside the museum, the art critic was intercepted by a person who smashed a cake in her face.

On February 8, 2020, she caused the accidental destruction of the work Nimble and Sinister Tricks (To be Preserved with Out Scandal and Corruption) by the artist Gabriel Rico, exhibited at the OMR Gallery stand of the 17th edition of Zona Maco that is being held at the Citibanamex Center in Mexico City. She stated that it was an accident that happened when trying to place a soda can on the piece. The OMR Gallery indicated that it would not take legal action against Lésper.

== Published work ==
- Lésper, Avelina. El fraude del arte contemporáneo. Bogotá: Panamerica Formas e Impresos, 2016.
