= Charles Cordier =

French sculptor

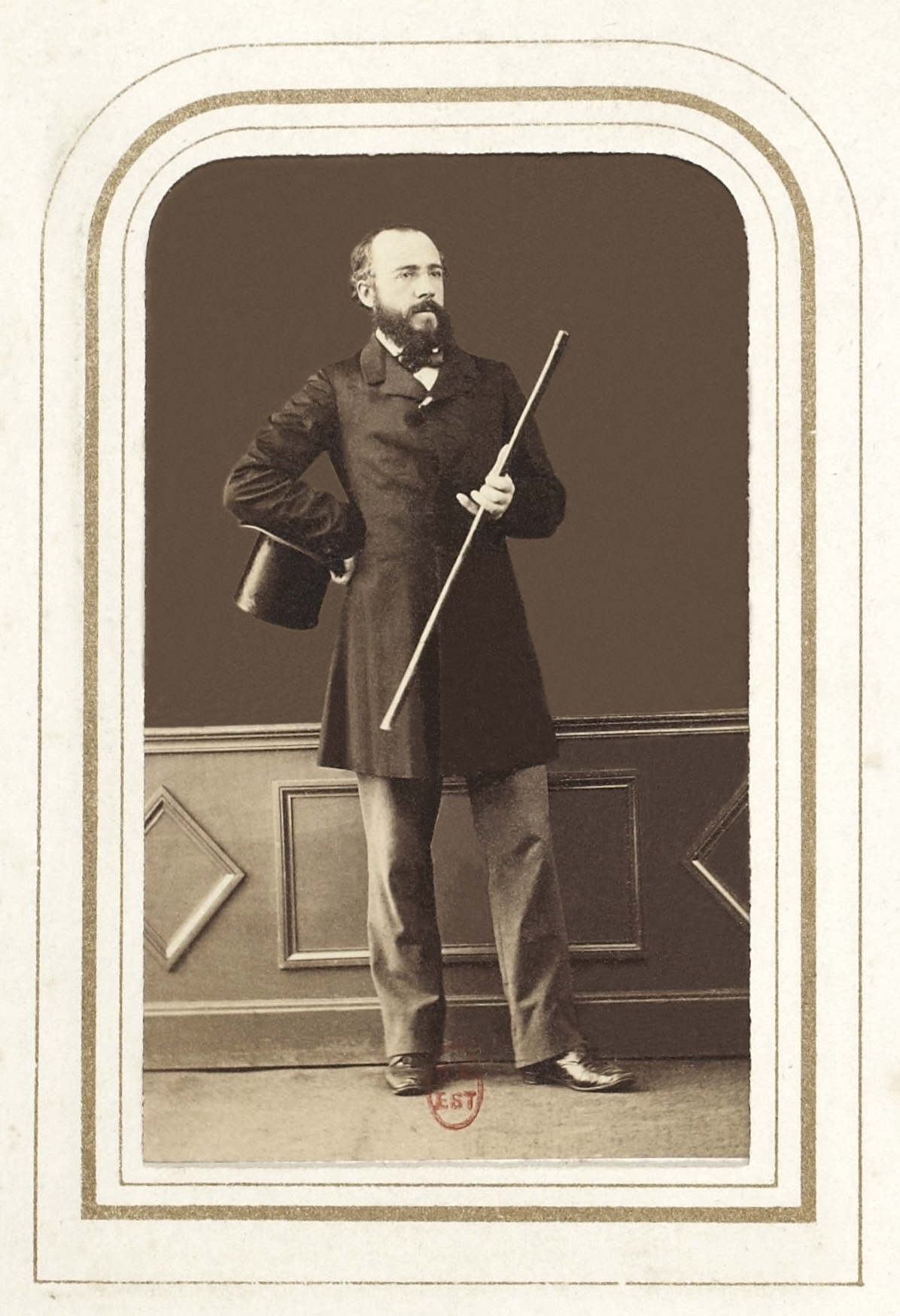
- Charles Cordier, ca.1860 photograph, Paris, BnF.
- Born: 19 October 1827; Cambrai
- Died: 30 May 1905 (aged 78); Algiers
- Education: École des Beaux-Arts
- Known for: Sculpture, Painting

Charles Henri Joseph Cordier (19 October 1827 – 30 May 1905) was a French sculptor of ethnographic subjects. He is known for his polychrome sculptures in the later realist phase of Orientalism.

== Early life and education ==
Cordier was born in Cambrai, North of Paris in 1827.

== Career ==
Two works by Cordier

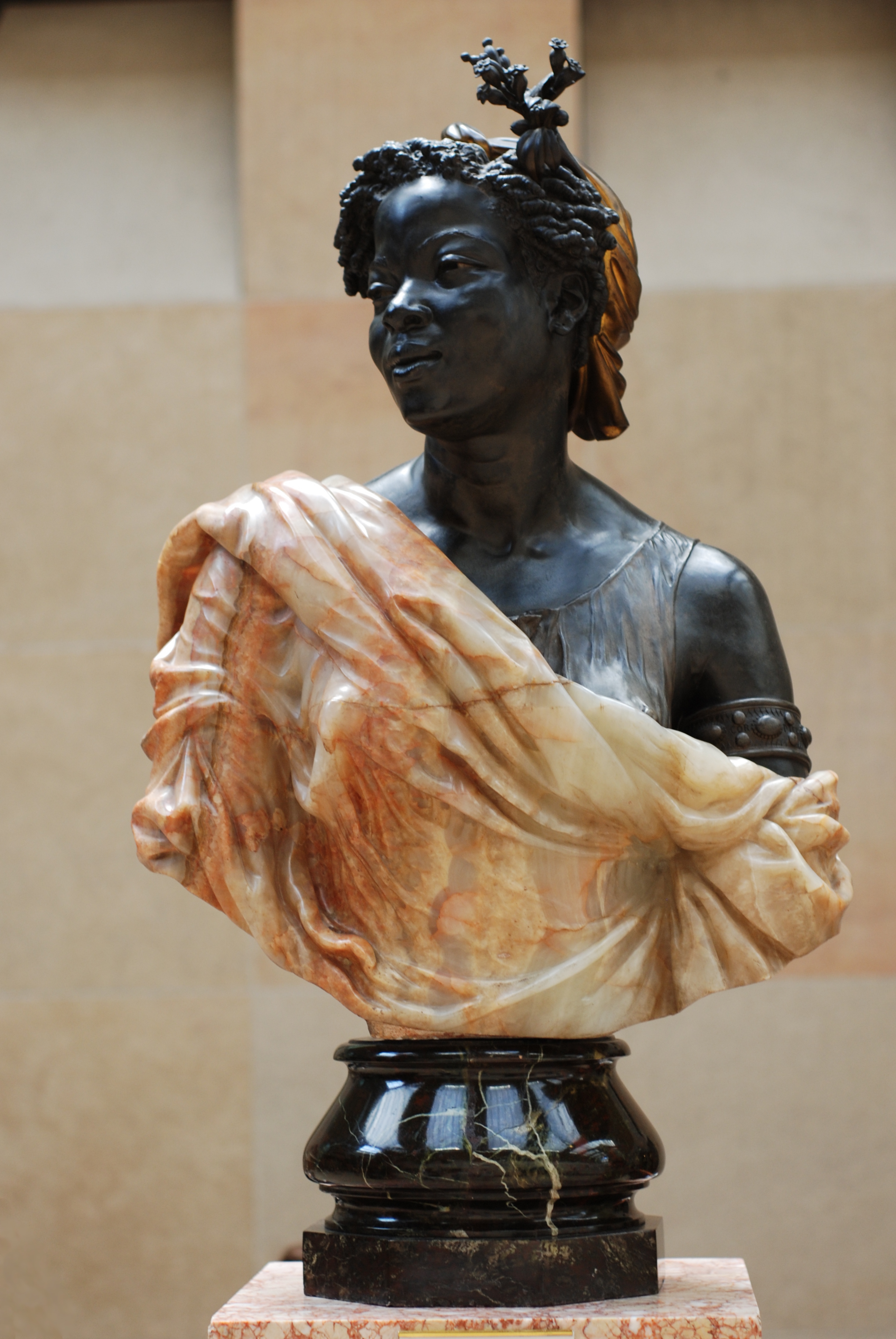
Woman of the Colonies (1861), Paris, Musée d'Orsay

In 1847, a meeting with Seïd Enkess, a former black slave who had become a model, determined the course of his career.

His first success was a bust in plaster of a Sudanese man "Saïd Abdullah of the Mayac, Kingdom of the Darfur" (Sudan), exhibited at the Paris Salon of 1848, the same year that slavery was abolished in all French colonies. It is now housed at The Walters Art Museum. In 1851, Queen Victoria bought a bronze of it at the Great Exhibition of London.

In 1851 he created “Bust of an African Woman" renamed "African Venus" by Théophile Gautier.

From 1851 to 1866, Cordier served as the official sculptor of Paris' National Museum of Natural History. During this time, he traveled abroad, and conceived a project to sculpt a series of ethnic types, spectacularly lifelike busts for their new ethnographic gallery. (now housed in the Musee de l'Homme, Paris). In 1856, he traveled to Algeria, discovered onyx deposits in then reopened ancient quarries and began to use the stone in busts.

Cordier also depicted European types from different parts of France, Greece and Italy. His artistic credo was however in conscious opposition to the largely Eurocentric viewpoint prevailing in his day. In 1860 Cordier became a member of the Society of Anthropology of Paris, founded by Paul Broca in 1859. In 1862, addressing the French Society of Anthropology, Cordier stated:

"Beauty does not belong to a single, privileged race. I have promoted throughout the world of art the idea that beauty is everywhere. Every race has its own beauty, which differs from that of others. The most beautiful black person is not the one who looks most like us."

("Le beau n'est pas propre à une race privilégiée, j'ai émis dans le monde artistique l'idée de l'ubiquité du beau. Toute race a sa beauté qui diffère de celle des autres races. Le plus beau nègre n'est pas celui qui nous ressemble le plus.")

Cordier took part in the great works commissioned by the Second French Empire (Paris Opera, Musée du Louvre, the Hôtel de Ville) or by illustrious patrons including Queen Victoria, Napoléon III and Empress Eugénie, Baron James de Rothschild, and the Marquess of Hertford.

From 1890 until his death in 1905 Cordier lived in Algiers, on the Westernized Rue de Tivoli.

== Critical reception ==
In 2005, Barbara Larson critically discussed an exhibition at Musée d`Orsay, pointing out connections between colonial interventions and aesthetic production as well as feminist aspects. She also revealed that Cordier was not the "prescient advocate of nonracist thinking" he has often been made out to be.

In 2022, the curators of The Colour of Anxiety, an exhibition at the Henry Moore Institute in Leeds, which shows two sculptures of Cordier (La femme africaine, 1857 and Venus africaine, 1899) have commented that " While white male sculptors such as John Bell and Charles Cordier intended to bring the pathos of the institution of slavery to public attention, yet they nonetheless traded on the allure of illicit sexuality born of that same system."

== See also ==
- Monument to Christopher Columbus (Paseo de la Reforma, Mexico City)

== Bibliography ==
- Laure de Margerie, Édouard Papet & al. Facing the other: Charles Cordier (1827–1905), ethnographic sculptor. New York: Harry N. Abrams, 2004. ISBN 0-8109-5606-3
- Pierre Dalibard c'était le temps où Charles Cordier unissait l'onyx et le bronze. Éditions Tensing, 2012. ISBN 978-2-919750-11-5
