= Pedro Reyes (artist) =

Mexican artist (born 1972)

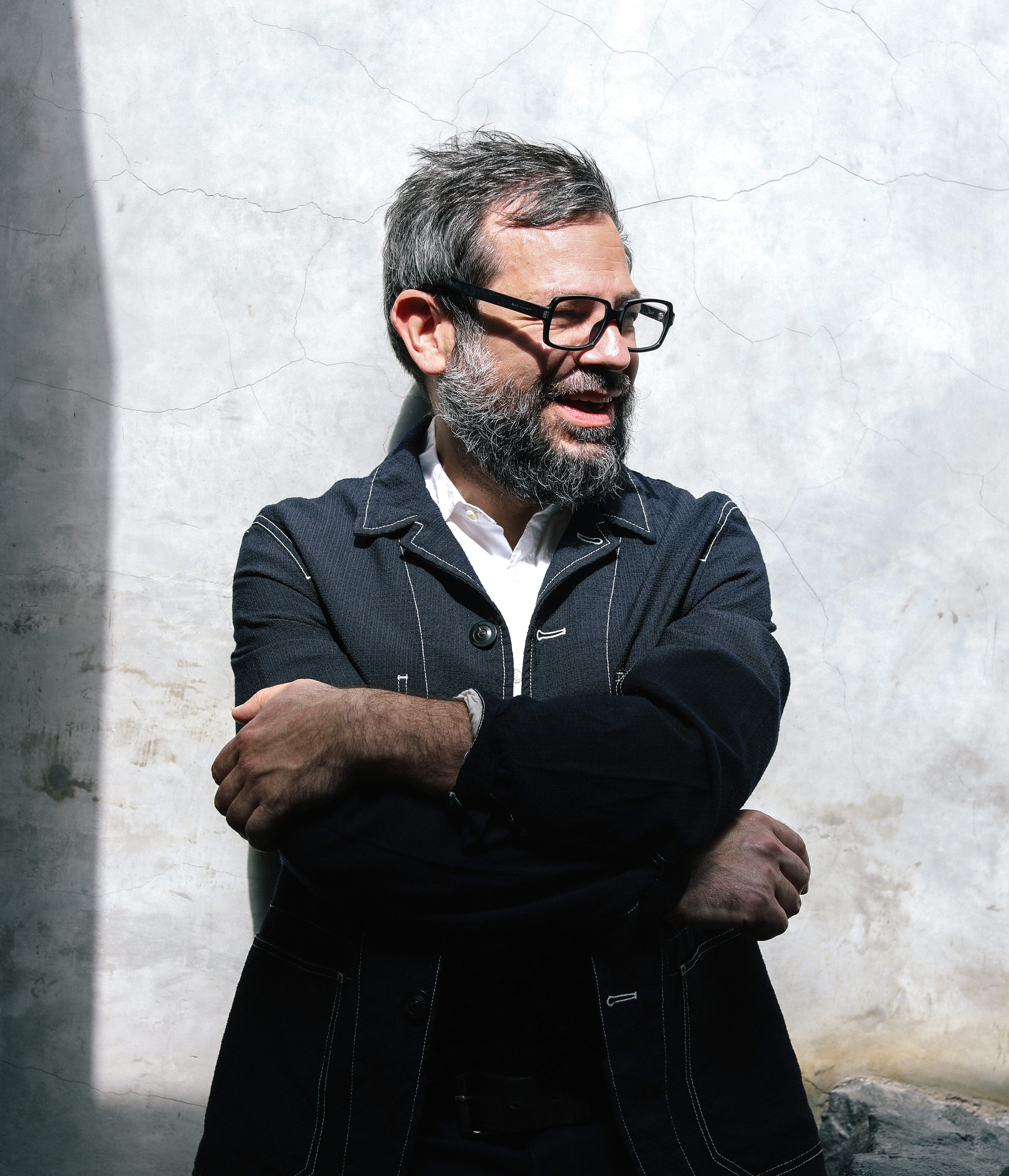
- Reyes in 2018
- Born: 1972 (age 53–54); Mexico City, Mexico

Pedro Reyes (born 1972) is a Mexican artist. He uses sculpture, architecture, video, performance, and participation. His works aims to increase individual or collective agency in social, environmental, political or educational situations. He has exhibited internationally, and is represented by Lisson Gallery. Reyes lives and works in his birth nation of Mexico.

== Biography ==
After studying Architecture, Reyes founded "Torre De Los Vientos", an experimental project space in Mexico City which operated from 1996-2002.

In 2015, he received the U.S. State Department Medal for the Arts, and was named a Ford Foundation Art of Change Fellow.

In 2016, he was visiting lecturer at MIT's Art, Culture and Technology program where he co-taught the course The Reverse Engineering of Warfare: Challenging Techno-optimism and Reimagining the Defense Sector (an Opera for the End of Times)” in conjunction with Carla Fernández. The course explored the interplay of imperialism, armed interventions, the defense budget, the history of engineering and military technology, crisis management in environmental disasters, popular entertainment and the global imbalances created by the West’s fixation on technological advancement. The resulting performance included collaborative creative enactments of the actual facts and the (often unasked) ethical questions faced by society today.

In 2017, he was the inaugural Dasha Zhukova Distinguished Visiting Artist at MIT Center for Art, Science & Technology.

Ad usum: to be used, a monograph of his work, edited by José L. Falconi, was published by Harvard University Press in late 2017.

== Projects ==
=== Palas por Pistolas ===
“Palas por Pistolas” is an art project and a campaign to curb the trade of small weapons into Mexico. The campaign was first organized with the support of the Botanical Garden of Culiacán and the City authorities. The population was invited by a series of TV ads and radio announcements to exchange firearms for vouchers and electric appliances. The campaign broke the national record of voluntary donation, and the firearms were crushed by a steamroller, melted and re-moulded into 1,527 gardening tools. These shovels have been distributed to a number of art institutions and public schools where adults and children engage in the action of planting 1527 trees. Tree plantings have taken place at the Vancouver Art Gallery (2008), San Francisco Art Institute (2008) Maison Rouge, Paris (2008), Lyon Biennial (2009), Marfa, Texas (2010), Denver, Colorado (2010), Boston (2011). It aims to show how “an agent of death can become an agent of life”.

=== Disarm ===
"Disarm" was another art project that Pedro Reyes created that was produced in relation to "Palas por Pistolas." For this project, Reyes was contacted by Mexican government officials who were informed of the work Reyes was doing to help gun control in Culiacán, Mexico. They reached out to Reyes to notify him about the 6,700 confiscated guns that they had received to see if he could use them. Keeping in mind how the shovels in "Palas Por Pistolas" had brought people together, Reyes decided to use the guns and their parts to create musical instruments. He was able to construct wind and percussion devices that could actually produce sound. The instruments were then used in a performance in 2012 at the Mexico City gallery Proyecto Liquido. After exhibiting the performance there, "Disarm" went on to several other galleries around the world. This piece was called involved musicians who helped Reyes create assemblage like instruments based on their unusual sound. Reyes talked about the musical instruments sound as an “exorcism or an elegy.”

=== Baby Marx ===
"Baby Marx" is a puppet comedy, featuring as main characters Karl Marx and Adam Smith. It first started as Reyes’ contribution to the 2008 Yokohama Triennale and then as a Project for the CCA Kitakyushu. Curator Akiko Miyake and puppet master Takumi Ota worked with Reyes to create a series of puppets and a trailer which were exhibited in a traveling show in Japan. Mexican production house Detalle Films became interested in producing the first episode that would become a TV series. A pilot was shot in 2009 which created interest in a feature film rather than a TV series. Recently Baby Marx has been shown at the Walker Art Center, in Minneapolis, and a series of small clips have been released for the internet.

=== Sanatorium ===
"Sanatorium" is a temporary clinic that provides short, unexpected therapies. Brought to Brooklyn in 2011 with the Guggenheim's support, Sanatorium is a utopian clinic of topical treatments for those inner-city afflictions we are all too familiar with: stress, loneliness and hyper-stimulation. In two-hour windows, Sanatorium visitors experience up to 3 sessions from 16 options through meetings with a series of “therapists". In "therapy" one gets to play and consider self. The cure is in the process, powered by what the individual is willing to give and unload. All 16 treatments are based on traditional methods of expression or respected forms of perception changing programming. Balancing reality and fiction, Sanatorium draws from Gestalt psychology, theater warm-up exercises, Fluxus events, conflict resolution techniques, trust-building games, corporate coaching, psychodrama, and hypnosis. In 2012, Sanatorium has been presented in DOCUMENTA (13), the Whitechapel Gallery in 2013, Toronto's The Power Plant in 2014, ICA Miami, CAM St Louis, and OCA São Paulo in 2015.

=== pUN: People's United Nations ===
pUN is an experimental conference in which regular citizens act as delegates for each of the countries in the UN and seek to apply techniques and resources from social psychology, theater, art, and conflict resolution to geopolitics. The first edition of the People's UN was presented at the Queens Museum in 2013. pUN’s second edition took place at the Hammer Museum in Los Angeles (2015). The third General Assembly of pUN took place in December 2015 at the 21st Century Museum of Contemporary Art in Kanazawa, Japan.

=== Entomofagia ===
Entomofagia (Spanish for entomophagy–the practice of eating insects) is a series of culinary experiments. The first happened in 2013 at Casa do Vidro in São Paulo, where a small snack cart offered visitors a Brazilian street food specialty: giant ants. The project focuses on the enormous ecological advantages of shifting protein consumption to insects. As an alternative to the ubiquitous fast-food staple, the beef hamburger, Reyes created the Grasswhopper, a burger with a patty made of crickets, a common snack in southern Mexico.

=== Amendment to the Amendment ===
In 2015, Reyes created Amendment to the Amendment, a traveling workshop where US citizens take part in a rewrite of the Second Amendment. Inspired in Legislative Theater, this workshop is a sort of massive hackathon where the public creates rewrites of the Second Amendment. In a series of workshops, a two-act play exploring the interpretation of gun legislation, specifically the Second Amendment of the U.S. Constitution is developed.

=== Doomocracy ===
"Doomocracy" is a major temporary installation put together with the help of Creative Time at the Brooklyn Army Terminal in Brooklyn, New York. The exhibition also had a successful Kickstarter croudfunding campaign that raised $86,064 with the help of 398 backers. Written by playwright Paul Hufker, The show was performed Friday, Saturday and Sunday nights at timed intervals from 6 p.m. to midnight, from 7 October through Halloween until 7 December 2016 right after the 2016 US presidential election. This immersive installation combined both ideas of Halloween and the 2016 US presidential election to create a haunted house of sorts discussing the current political landscape. The Brooklyn Army terminal was once the largest military supply base in the United States which makes it the perfect backdrop for the exhibition especially at night. Visitors were faced with situations ripped directly from the news, issues such as stop & frisk, voter fraud, pandemic gun violence, drugs and the US healthcare system as a white-collar drug dealer, diabetes, CEO bailouts and commentary on the rich, GMO's, abortion, climate change, privatization of national parks, and drone strikes. Doomocracy visitors are able to explore the depth and breadth of the American political anxieties in these situations they are thrown into.

=== Manufacturing Mischief ===
In addition to his position as lecturer in the MIT Program in Art, Culture and Technology, Reyes met with MIT faculty and researchers to develop potential collaborative projects. As part of his research Reyes met with Professor Noam Chomsky, to whom he proposed making a play featuring Chomsky as the protagonist. Reyes has integrated theater into his repertoire since 2008, often using handmade puppets from Japan, inspired by the Bunraku tradition. Reyes’ puppet plays include The Permanent Revolution (2014) on the life of Leon Trotsky and other political satires featuring key figures in the history of philosophy, such as Karl Marx and Adam Smith. In Manufacturing Mischief, the character of Noam Chomsky finds an antagonist in Ayn Rand, who has never been taken seriously in academia, yet continues to be read widely and is a source of ideologies associated with Trumpism. Elon Musk is a technocratic hero today, in the tradition of Henry Ford and Steve Jobs. These and other characters are brought into the play, written by playwright Paul Hufker, by a Deus ex machina called the Print-A-Friend, an apparatus where a book is put in and out comes the author. Manufacturing Mischief premiered at MIT April 2018. The following months, it will be staged at Carnegie Mellon University in Pittsburgh, The Tank in New York City, The Power Plant in Toronto, and the Serpentine Galleries in London.

=== Music for Lithophones ===
A lithophone is a percussion instrument made of stone. In particular, these instruments belong to the subgenre of the linguaphones (solid corbels that emerge from a central block). These are monolithic blocks with parallel cuts of various lengths and depths, which result in prisms that, when struck, produce different musical notes. Its presence is at the same time optical, haptic and acoustic, unlike any other musical instrument. Lithophones are always an anomaly in the musical universe, being always different in their form and sound spectrum. Some of the pieces presented here are inspired by Aztec teponaxtles (a drum made from a hollow trunk). The other pieces obey a scheme of linear progressions where geometry manifests as a generator of space and sound vibration. Unlike other percussion instruments, it is difficult to imagine these pieces in a festive or even rhythmic context. The cavernous and ceremonial atmosphere they produce is closer to the hypnotic sounds used in meditation or improvisation. Without establishing a hierarchy between stage and proscenium, its disposition in the room is akin to the Xenakis polytopes, in the way that the interpreters and the public will have to move. For this project, the Mexican percussion ensemble Tambuco will make a series of presentations in which they will play a composition made expressly by Ricardo Gallardo. The new record label graznido.tapes has inaugurated its catalog with the edition of 300 audiocassettes with the project s music. It is not the first time that Pedro Reyes makes musical sculptures made with unexpected materials, as is the case of Disarm (2012), where he transformed firearms into instruments, or Satori (2016) where he worked with Balinese gongs percussed by mechanized drumsticks. Six years ago the sculptural practice of Reyes began to manifest itself in direct carvings on stone, and these two slopes; the sculpture in stone and the production of instruments, converge in this lithophones.

=== Tlali ===
Tlali (based on the Nahuatl word "tlalli", which often leads to confusion regarding the correct spelling of the title) is a sculpture of a colossal visage. Its initial design was of a complete head inspired by the colossal Olmec heads found in Veracruz, Mexico. The features of the face blend smooth arched eyebross with feline eyes and a downturned mouth with a flaring upper lip, such as those often found in Olmec sculptures. It had been proposed to replace a Monument to Christopher Columbus by Mexico City's mayor, Claudia Sheinbaum, on 5 September 2021. The announcement, design, name, and the selection of Reyes as the sculptor, as well the undiscussed removal of Columbus, created controversy. Reyes was criticized because he was a mestizo man, not an indigenous woman, and had created a generalized portrait of an indigenous woman. A few days later, following a petition signed by more than 300 members of Mexico’s cultural sector, Sheinbaum announced that Tlali would not be installed at that site. This decision came despite the support of more than 5,000 Indigenous women, who signed a different petition and expressed their support for the work during the public act “Dignificación de Tlali” (Dignifying Tlali). Tlali is a direct stone carving made from volcanic rock sourced from a quarry on the skirts of Popocatépetl. In 2026, the sculpture was installed at the north entrance of the David Geffen Galleries at the Los Angeles County Museum of Art (LACMA). The museum's collection includes several examples of Olmec masks, providing an art historical context that informs interpretations of Reyes' work.

=== Permanent collections. ===
Reyes works and site specific projects are included in the permanent collections of museums and cultural organizations around the Americas such as the Pérez Art Museum Miami; Museum of Fine Arts, Boston; Brooklyn Museum, New York; Museum of Contemporary Art Chicago; Carnegie Museum of Art, Pittsburgh; Colección Jumex, Mexico City; Institute of Contemporary Art, Miami; Kadist Art Foundation, San Francisco; MAXXI, Rome, Italy; University Museum of Contemporary Art, Mexico City (MUAC); Museo Rufino Tamayo, Mexico City; Vancouver Art Gallery, Vancouver; and Walker Art Center, Minneapolis, among others.
