= Fuente de la República =

Fountain in Mexico City, Mexico

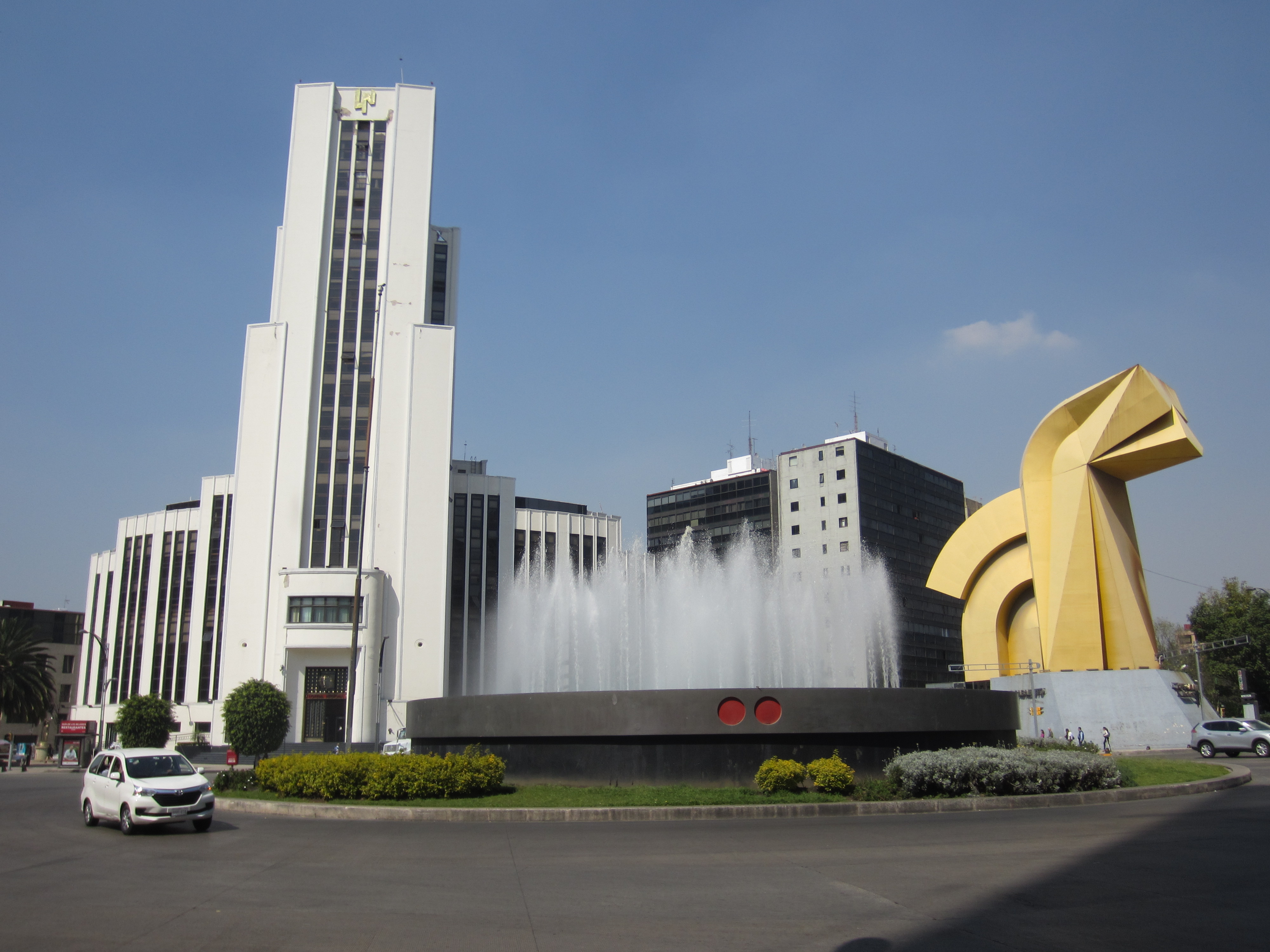
- The fountain in 2018
- Location
- Artist: Manuel Felguérez
- Year: 2007
- Medium: Concrete and carbon steel
- Dimensions: 20 m diameter (66 ft)
- Location: Mexico City; 19°26′08″N 99°08′58″W

The Fuente de la República (lit. transl. Republic Fountain) is a carbon steel fountain and sculpture installed in Mexico City, Mexico. It was inaugurated on 13 December 2007 by Marcelo Ebrard, the Federal District's head of government, and was placed at the intersection of Avenida Paseo de la Reforma, Avenida Juárez and Avenida Bucareli, in the Cuauhtémoc borough. The fountain was created specifically for the celebrations of the 200th anniversary of the country's independence in 2010. It was designed by Manuel Felguérez, who also designed the Puerta 1808 sculpture found in front of it.

== History and design ==
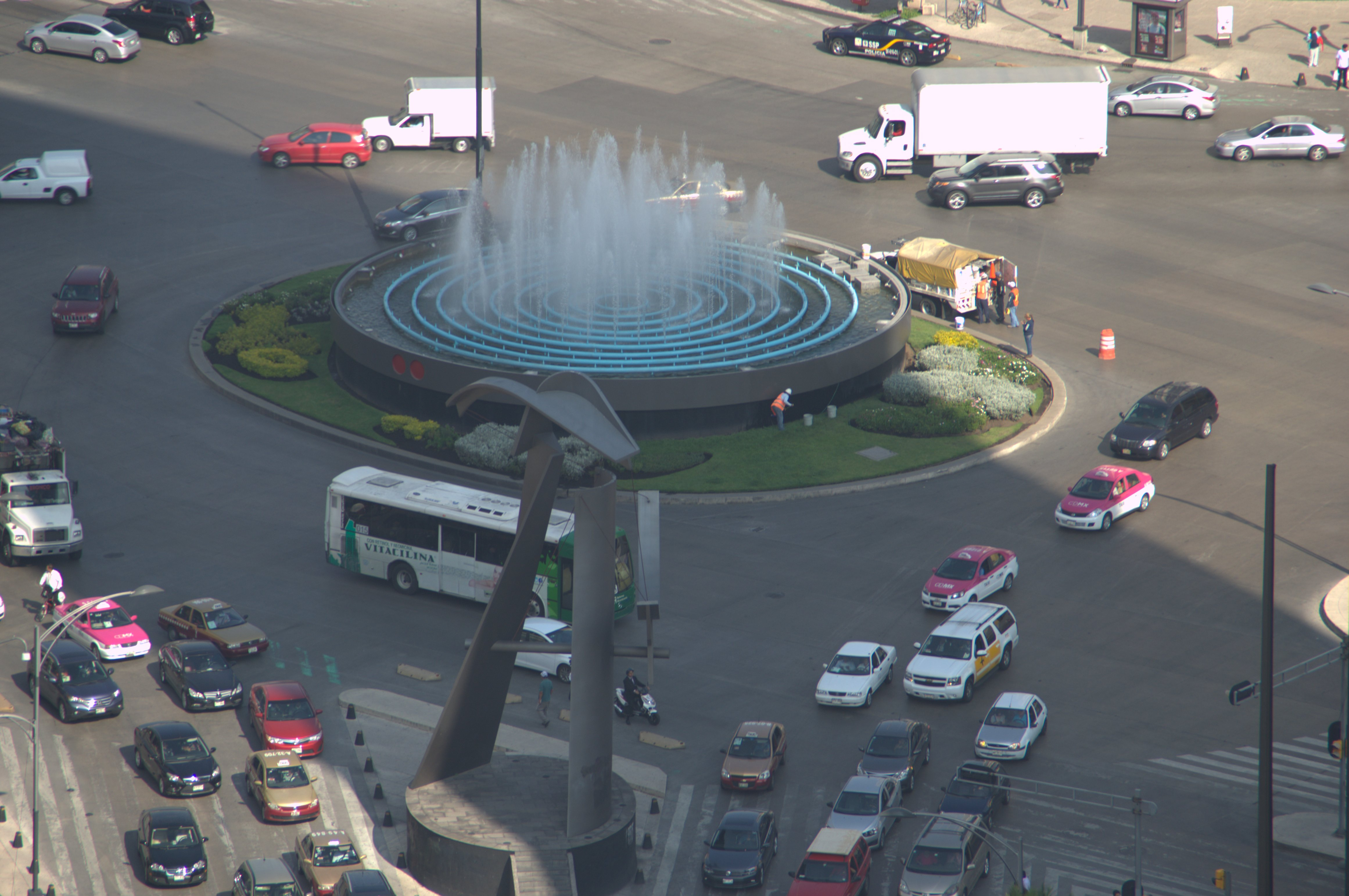
The interior of the fountain with Puerta 1808 in front of it

During the planning of the installation of Puerta 1808, Manuel Felguérez used the space to conceptualize how to place it on the corner of Paseo de la Reforma and Avenida Juárez. He mentioned that, at that time, there was only a traffic circle with poorly maintained grass and commented to his team that a fountain could improve the view; the roundabout replaced the Glorieta del Caballito, whose main sculpture was removed in 1979. He suggested it not be too high to avoid taking attention away from all the visible monuments in the area. On the day Puerta 1808 was inaugurated (20 October 2007), Felguérez hinted to Marcelo Ebrard, the head of government, that a fountain would be a good way to decorate the space, and he approved it. Felguérez designed it in situ with the Monumento a la Revolución as a visual reference. The jets of water it would spurt would take the shape of the monument, with high curves in the center and tapering curves at the sides. These reach 2 meters (6 ft 7 in) in height. Juan Álvarez del Castillo was chosen as the architect. The concrete fountain is coated with carbon steel; it is 20 m (66 ft) in diameter, has 700 water jets, 200 lamps and eight pumps that move 100 cubic meters (3,500 cu ft) of recycled water. Felguérez said that the fountain is different from others because instead of having a sculpture in the center, the fountain itself is the sculpture. On the border two red circles are painted to represent the eyes of Mexico. The fountain was inaugurated on 13 December 2007 for the celebrations of the 200th anniversary of the country's independence in 2010.
