= Puerta 1808 =

Sculpture in Mexico City, Mexico

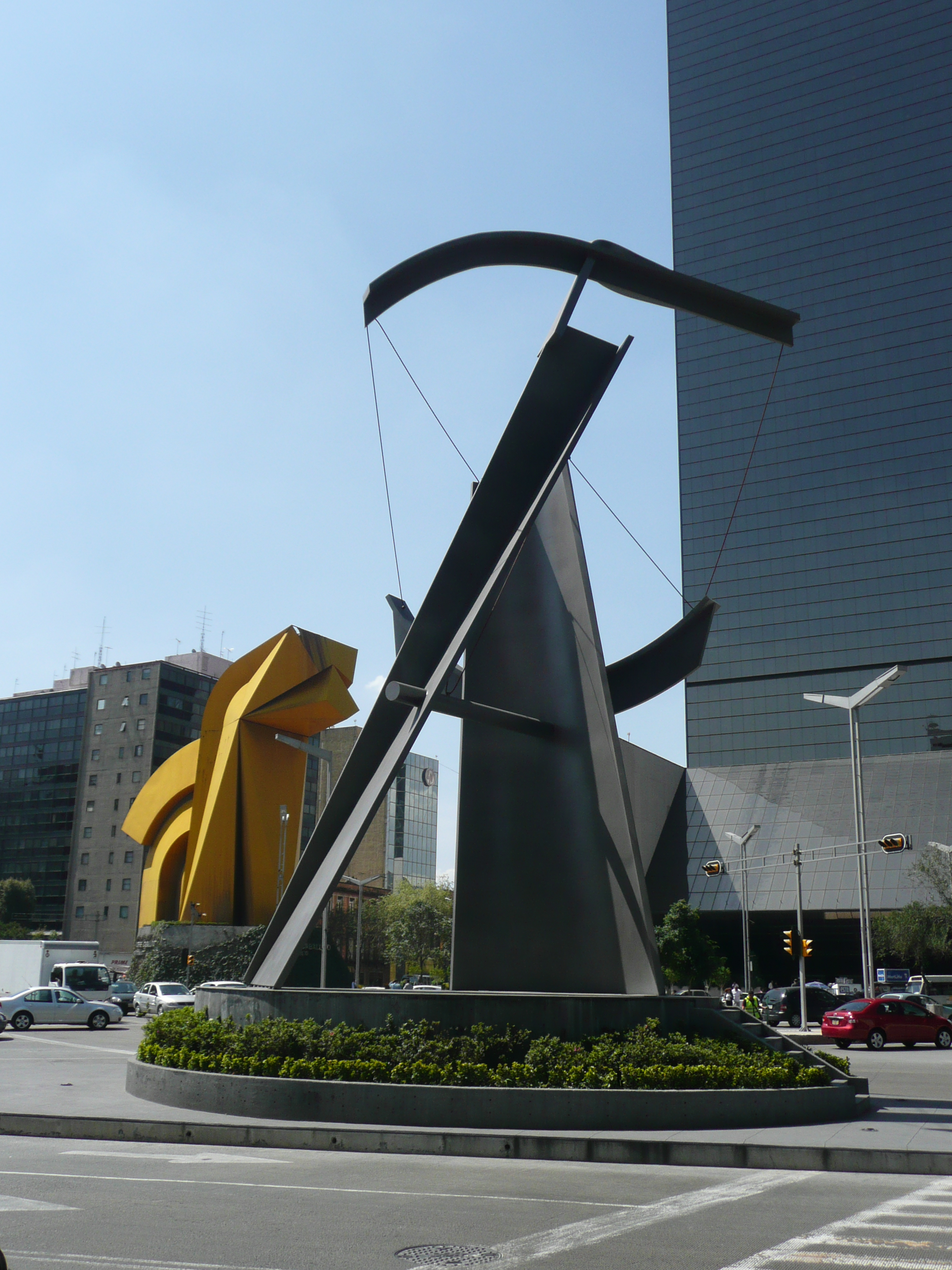
- The sculpture in 2007, with El Caballito in the background
- Location
- Artist: Manuel Felguérez
- Year: 2007
- Medium: Carbon steel
- Dimensions: 17 m (56 ft)
- Location: Mexico City, Mexico
- 19°26′07.6″N 99°8′56.5″W

Puerta 1808 (Spanish for "Gateway") is an outdoor carbon steel sculpture by Manuel Felguérez installed in Mexico City, Mexico. It was inaugurated on 20 October 2007 by Marcelo Ebrard, the head of government, and was placed in the corner of Paseo de la Reforma and Avenida Juárez, in Cuauhtémoc. It is a 15 meters (49 feet) high sculpture that lies on a 2 meters (6 ft 7 in) high plinth.

The number in its name represents the year 1808 referencing the country's pre-independence events of 1810. Despite its name, it is an abstract sculpture that is not a traditional gateway-shaped figure. Felguérez said it represents one symbolically as it is the starting point to the historic center of Mexico City. He also dedicated it to Francisco Primo de Verdad y Ramos, a New Spain lawyer imprisoned by the Spanish authorities for his independentist advocacy and who died in a prison in 1808. Puerta 1808 was created specifically for the celebrations of the 200th anniversary of the country's independence. The work was complemented with the Fuente de la República placed a few meters away.

Álvaro Medina, from the Durban Segnini Gallery, described the sculpture as a "structure composed of a pair of triangles, the trunk of a cone divided vertically, a pair of cantilevered arched beams, a tubular linear beam and a few tensors".

Later in his life, Felguérez said about Puerta 1808: "It is a living sculpture: it changes its look in every demonstration; it is colored with the slogans of the nonconformists in turn. And this, far from bothering me or being a grievance for the sculpture, gives it dynamism and validity that will only be exhausted when we live in a fair country and when all social demands have been satisfied. That is to say, never".
