= Glorieta del Caballito =

Former roundabout in Mexico City

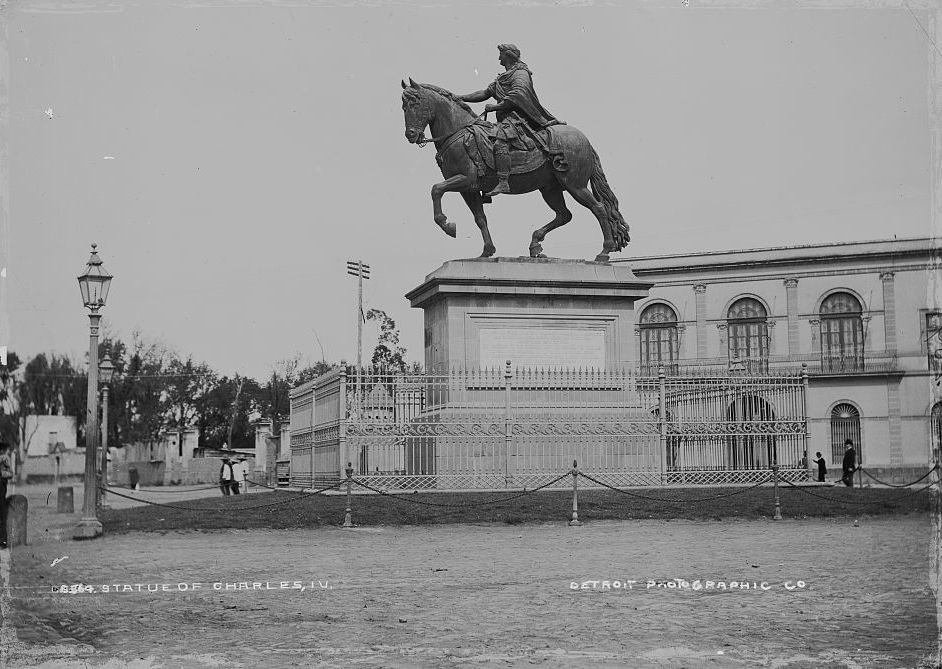
- Glorieta del Caballito sometime between 1880 and 1897

Location

Construction
- Type: Roundabout

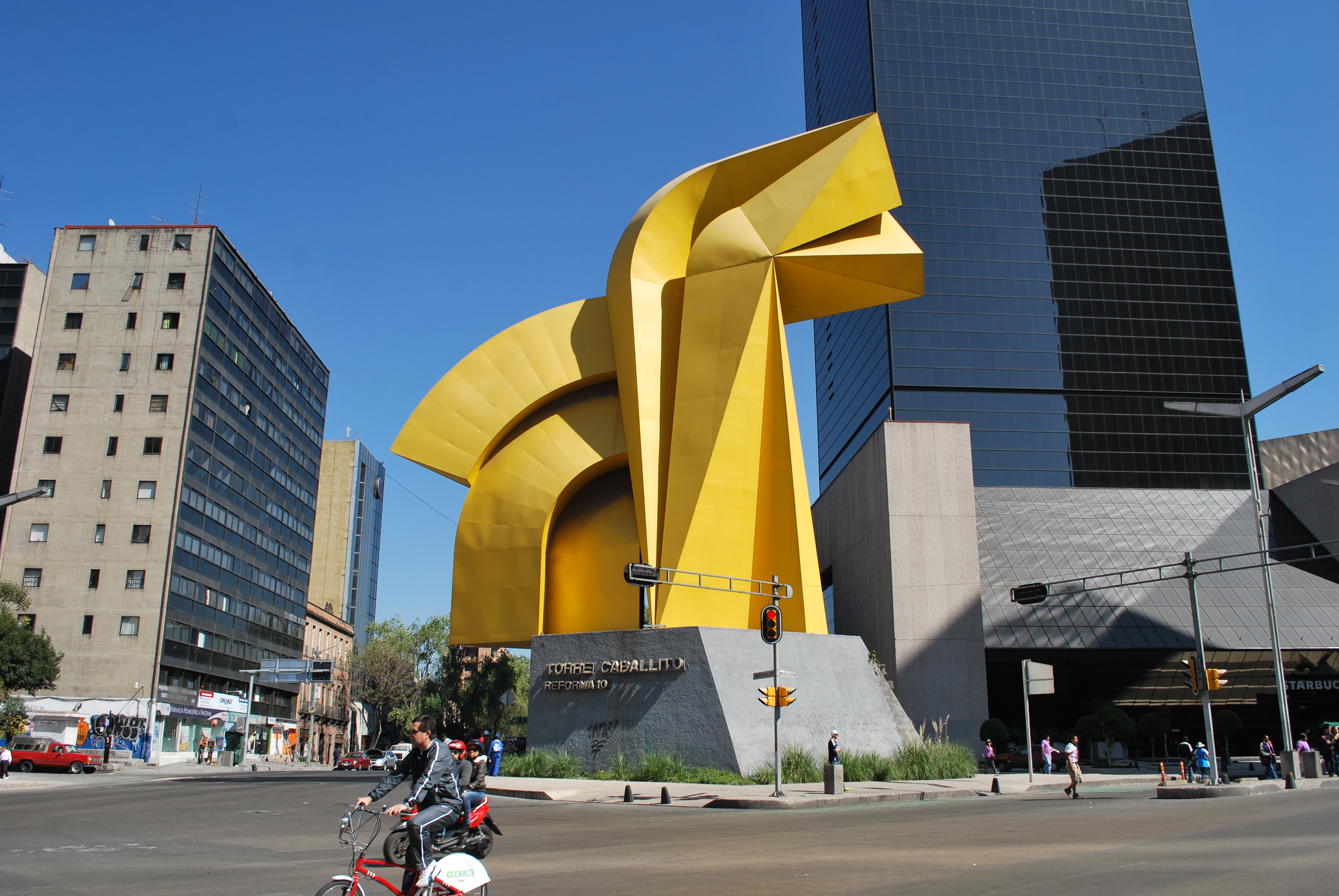
Glorieta del Caballito in 2011

Glorieta del Caballito was a roundabout in the northeastern part of the Paseo de la Reforma, where it crosses Avenida Bucareli, in Mexico City. Until 1964, it was the northern end of the Paseo de la Reforma, which was then extended. Northeast of the roundabout stood for a long time the bullfighting arena Plaza de Toros del Paseo Nuevo.

The roundabout was named after El Caballito, an equestrian statue of Charles IV of Spain that stood in the middle of the roundabout until 1979. That year, the roundabout was turned into an intersection, and the statue was moved to its current location on the Plaza Manuel Tolsá. It was replaced by a modernist, yellow horse head sculpture by Sebastián.

At the intersection today are the skyscrapers Torre del Caballito and Torre Prisma.
