= El Caballito =

El Caballito may refer to:

- El Caballito (Mexico City Metrobús), a BRT station in Mexico City
- El Caballito (Sebastián), a sculpture in Mexico City
- Equestrian statue of Charles IV of Spain, a sculpture in Mexico City
- The Boy on the Seahorse, Puerto Vallarta, Mexico
