= Fundación ICA aerial photography archive =

Mexican archive of historical aerial photographs

- Fondo Aerofotográfico, Acervo Histórico Fundación ICA
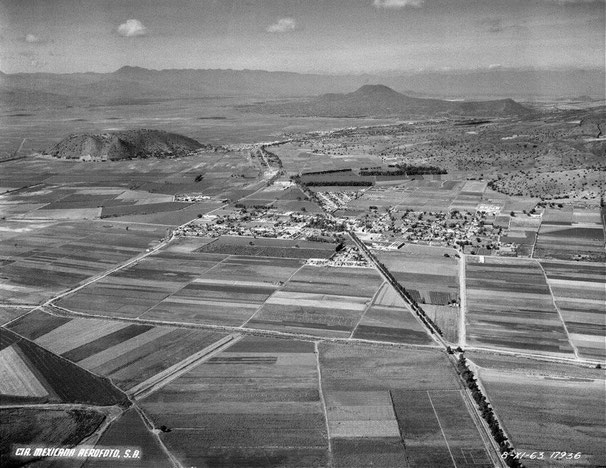
- Ixtapaluca, State of Mexico, photographed by the Compañía Mexicana Aerofoto in 1963
- Location: Avenida del Parque 91, Colonia Nápoles, Benito Juárez, Mexico City, Mexico
- Type: Photographic archive
- Scope: Aerial photography of Mexico and parts of Central and South America, 1930–1994
- Established: 1930 (as the archive of the Compañía Mexicana Aerofoto); 2000 (custody transferred to Fundación ICA)

Collection
- Items collected: Vertical and oblique aerial negatives, photomosaics, flight index maps
- Size: About 1.1 million items

Access and use
- Access requirements: On request to Fundación ICA

Other information
- Website: fundacion-ica.org.mx

The Fundación ICA aerial photography archive (Spanish: Fondo Aerofotográfico) is a collection of about one million historical aerial photographs of Mexico, held by Fundación ICA in Colonia Nápoles, Mexico City. Most of the photographs were taken by the Compañía Mexicana Aerofoto (also written Compañía Mexicana de Aerofoto), an aerial survey company founded in 1930 by the pilot Luis Struck. The construction group Empresas ICA bought the company in 1965 and later gave the negatives to its foundation. The photographs date from 1932 to 1994 and cover about 1.2 million square kilometers, much of Mexico plus survey work in other Latin American countries. There are views of Mexico City and other cities as they grew, of highways, dams and irrigation districts under construction, and of landscapes such as Lake Texcoco in the 1930s.

UNESCO entered the collection on its Mexican national Memory of the World register in 2013 and on the register for Latin America and the Caribbean in 2014. (Note: Fundación ICA's 2020 guide gives 2013 for the national register and 2014 for the regional one in its section on awards, but its introduction puts both in 2014. León García gives 2013 and 2014.) In April 2025 it was added to the international register as "Aerial Photography from the Ingenieros Civiles Asociados (ICA) Foundation". Selections have been shown at the Museo Nacional de Arte, the National Autonomous University of Mexico (UNAM) and the Museo Dolores Olmedo.

== History ==
=== Background ===
A Fairchild K-3 aerial camera, from the line Sherman Fairchild began developing in 1919

In 1927 the engineer Francisco Antúnez Echegaray wrote about aerial "photo-topography" and its practical uses in the journal Planificación. Two years later, on 4 April 1929, the American firm of Sherman Fairchild, then the best-known name in professional aerial photography, photographed Mexico City from the air.

=== Compañía Mexicana Aerofoto (1930–1965) ===
Luis Struck, a Mexican pilot, and his brother founded the Compañía Mexicana Aerofoto, S.A. in 1930. (Note: Most sources, including Fundación ICA, give 1930. León García gives 1931, while Osorio Alarcón and Vargas Santiago date the start of the company's history to 1929.) The Struck brothers were the Mexican representatives of the Fairchild Camera and Instrument Corporation, and Fundación ICA describes the company as the former Fairchild Aerial Camera Corporation. It was the first Mexican company to specialize in aerial photography. The fleet started with twin-engined aircraft and later added three-engined ones, among them a trimotor registered XB-APG; Aerofoto flew over the country with them until the end of the 1960s.

Most of the work was for topographic plans. Two synchronized cameras under the aircraft took overlapping vertical photographs that could be viewed in stereo. Technicians then used photogrammetric restitution to correct the distortion between the overlapping images and to draw plans with accurate horizontal and vertical measurements. Much of this vertical work was commissioned by the Mexican government and used for mapping. In 1947 Ingenieros Civiles Asociados (ICA) was founded. It hired Aerofoto to photograph the routes of the highways, bridges and dams it was building, and became one of Aerofoto's main clients.

The oblique views, taken at an angle, are less technical. They show cities, industrial plants, new buildings and landscapes. Among the earliest are views of Mexico City from 1932: the Palacio de Bellas Artes still under construction, the Monument to Independence, the Zócalo and the Hipódromo neighborhood. From 1933 there are views of Tacubaya and its astronomical observatory, of Pátzcuaro, and of the Casino de la Selva in Cuernavaca.

=== Under ICA (1965–1989) ===
Struck died in 1965 and ICA bought the company the same year. (Note: The date of the purchase varies between sources. Fundación ICA, León García and Mendoza Vargas give 1965, Osorio Alarcón and Vargas Santiago give 1969, and a 2025 INAH publication gives 1960.) Aerofoto became a business unit in ICA's engineering division and added aerial photogrammetry, urban and rural cadastre, and geophysics to its services. Under ICA it also worked abroad: topographic surveys for the Alto Anchicayá dam in Colombia, photogrammetric surveys in the Dominican Republic and Panama, a property tax control system for Lima and an urban cadastre for Tegucigalpa. The collection also has photographs of Belize, Bolivia, El Salvador, Guatemala, Honduras and Nicaragua.

By the late 1980s satellite imagery was cheaper and more precise than large-format photography from aircraft. Aerofoto left ICA's engineering division in 1989 and stopped flying. In 58 years it had taken close to a million photographs.

=== Fundación ICA ===
ICA set up Fundación ICA in 1986, a year after the 1985 Mexico City earthquake, as a non-profit civil association (asociación civil). Its purpose was to support engineering research and training and to look after ICA's historical records. In 2000 ICA gave the foundation custody of the aerial photographs, and they became the core of its Acervo Histórico ('historical archive'). (Note: In an interview with El Financiero about the Memory of the World registration, the foundation's then director, Ana María Ruiz Vilá, said the collection had been in the foundation's hands since 1986. Most published accounts, including the foundation's own guide, give 2000 as the date of the transfer.) A master conservation plan followed within two years. In 2004 the foundation designed CODIFICA, a public online database of the scanned images, and in 2005 it started a project to organize and manage the collections.

The archive is listed in the National Register of Historical Archives of the General Archive of the Nation (AGN) as number MX09014AHFICA. The oblique and vertical series were registered with the National Copyright Institute (Indautor) in 2011.

== Contents ==
There are four series. Most negatives are on cellulose acetate; the oldest are on cellulose nitrate. The standard frame is 23 by 23 cm (about 9.5 by 9.5 in), and a smaller number are 18 by 18 cm. Some are cut frames, others rolls 75 to 150 meters long. Aerofoto used black-and-white, infrared and color film, at scales from 1:2,000 to 1:50,000. Most frames carry data written on them by Aerofoto at the time: place, date, flight altitude or scale, lens, flight strip and frame number.

Series of the aerial collection
Series	Code	Dates	Approximate size	Description
Obliques	FAO	1932–1968	20,000	Views taken with the camera's optical axis inclined at less than 87 degrees, mostly on nitrate negatives of about 9.5 by 9.5 in and 9.5 by 7.5 in. Industrial, urban and landscape subjects from 31 states.
Verticals	FAV	1930–1994	800,000–950,000 (Note: The foundation's 2020 guide gives both "more than 800,000 items" in 2,700 series and "more than 950,000 images"; reports on the 2025 UNESCO listing give more than 900,000.)	Overlapping survey photographs taken straight down by paired cameras under the aircraft, for stereoscopic models and topographic plans.
Mosaics	FAM	1930s–1990	44,000–55,000 (Note: The 2020 guide and Osorio Alarcón and Vargas Santiago give about 44,000; UNAM and press reports give 55,000.)	Vertical frames reduced photomechanically and photogrammetrically and pieced together on large plates of about 20 by 24 in, each covering a whole city, river basin or region.
Index maps	FAMI	various	1,682	Maps of the area covered by each flight, as ink drawings on tracing paper, cyanotypes, diazotypes, Van Dyke brown prints, photostats and drawings on treated cloth.

The vertical series was the basis for most industrial and infrastructure projects in Mexico in those years. The mosaics carry the producer's name "Planificaciones aéreas" in the lower left corner. They include Mexico City in 1941 and 1953, Lake Texcoco in 1955, the Valley of Mexico in 1966 and the then territory of Quintana Roo, also in 1966. The index maps had never been published. The foundation began cataloging and conserving them with support from Iberarchivos, the Ibero-American archives program, and in February 2023 Iberarchivos chose a 1936 index map of Mexico City as its "document of the month".

Fundación ICA's earlier catalog listed 73 river basins, 18 lakes and lagoons, 22 dams, 20 irrigation districts, 9 forest zones, about 120 urban areas and 2,286 engineering works. Estimates of how much of Mexico was photographed run from about 70 to 85 percent. Subjects include Ciudad Universitaria going up on the Pedregal lava field from 1949, Lecumberri prison, Churubusco Studios in 1946, Monterrey in 1943, Acapulco in 1951, Monte Albán in 1947 and the Parícutin volcano in 1962. The photographs of archaeological sites show how far excavation had gone at the time of each flight.

== Conservation and digitization ==
About 90 percent of the holdings are photosensitive material. The vault is kept at 15 °C and about 35 percent relative humidity, with activated carbon air filters, a Novec 1230 gas fire suppression system and mobile high-density shelving. Material going in or out passes through an acclimatization room first. Acetate negatives with vinegar syndrome are isolated and scanned first. Degraded nitrate negatives are a fire risk, as they can ignite at around 41 °C. The foundation plans to keep them frozen and thaw them under controlled conditions when they are to be scanned.

Scanning is done on an UltraScan 5000 photogrammetric scanner. Its settings were worked out with the National Institute of Astrophysics, Optics and Electronics (INAOE). A roll of 200 frames takes about a week. For each frame the foundation keeps an unedited TIFF master, an edited TIFF and JPEG copies. Vertical frames are georeferenced with control points against present-day imagery, flight coverages are plotted as Google Earth files, and digital orthomosaics are made from the vertical frames together with UNAM's Institute of Geography. Digital preservation follows the Open Archival Information System model. By 2019 about 450,000 images had been scanned. Students from the Escuela Nacional de Conservación, Restauración y Museografía and the Escuela Nacional de Biblioteconomía y Archivonomía work on the collection as interns.

== Access and rights ==
Fundación ICA holds the economic rights to the photographs, and they are not free to reuse. Researchers and others can ask for images by email, by phone or in person. Staff find the relevant flights on a map, and copies are sent once the user signs an agreement on how they will be used. Scanned images can be viewed on CODIFICA, and since 2018 selections have also been on Google Arts & Culture.

== Recognition ==
In 2016 the foundation received the National Archival Merit Award (Premio Nacional al Mérito Archivístico) from the AGN and the National Archives Council (CONARCH) for the conservation of the archive and for opening it to the public.

The international UNESCO listing was approved at the 221st session of UNESCO's Executive Board, on 17 April 2025. It was one of 74 collections added that day, bringing the international register to 570; Mexico submitted the nomination. UNESCO wrote that the series had helped to anticipate urban sprawl and climate change risks. Catherine Bloch, president of the Mexican Memory of the World committee, said that "very few nations have such a historical record". The previous Mexican collection on the international register was the Manuel Álvarez Bravo archive, in 2017. The geographer Héctor Mendoza Vargas calls the collection one of the most important archives of its kind in the world.

== Exhibitions and publications ==
In June 2007 large-format prints went up on the railings of Chapultepec park in the exhibition Memoria desde el aire 1932–1969 ('Memory from the air'). A second show, on the building of Ciudad Universitaria, was held in the foyer of the Sala Nezahualcóyotl concert hall. The book México: memoria desde el aire 1932–1969 came out with Lunwerg late that year; its first printing of 3,000 copies sold out. Also in 2007, for ICA's 60th anniversary, the airport operator Grupo Aeroportuario Centro Norte (OMA) showed ten Aerofoto views of Monterrey from 1932 to 1959 at Monterrey airport.

From 19 October 2012 to 13 January 2013 the Museo Nacional de Arte (MUNAL) held Transformaciones del paisaje urbano en México ('Transformations of the urban landscape in Mexico'). The art historian Peter Krieger curated it, pairing paintings and prints from the museum with aerial photographs from the archive. The bilingual catalog has an essay by Eugenia Macías on the history and technology of the archive. Between August and November 2016 UNAM's Institute of Geography hung large views of Mexico City from 1932 to 1969 on three floors of its main building. They included the El Toreo bullring and the Country Club in 1932, Churubusco Studios in 1946 and Ciudad Satélite in 1958. In 2017 the foundation marked 30 years of the historic center of Mexico City as a World Heritage Site with Retratos de lo público ('Portraits of the public'), aerial views of the center's squares, parks and streets. For ICA's 70th anniversary the Museo Dolores Olmedo hung aerial photographs next to murals by Juan O'Gorman, Francisco Eppens and Luis Nishizawa, to show how Mexico City grew. (Note: Mexico News Daily dates this exhibition to 2019, but ICA was founded in 1947, so its 70th anniversary fell in 2017.) In February and March 2019 the Centro de las Artes de San Agustín in San Agustín Etla showed Aerofoto | Oaxaca desde el aire ('Oaxaca from the air'). It followed Aerofoto's flights over Oaxaca, from the state capital in 1932 to Monte Albán in 1947, the beaches of Puerto Ángel in 1955 and Mitla in 1964.

Books Fundación ICA has published from the archive include Ciudad Universitaria, crisol del México moderno (2009), México prehispánico y virreinal (2011), Patrimonio aerofotográfico. Registro Memoria del Mundo de México (2014), El primer multifamiliar moderno. Centro Urbano Presidente Alemán (2017), Aerofoto (2017), Retratos de lo público (2017) and Construyendo México. 150 años de ingeniería y arquitectura en México (2018). A pocket guide to the whole archive, edited by Juan José Kochen, came out in 2018.

== Research use ==
Aerofoto prints also survive in other collections, such as that of the Instituto de Investigaciones Dr. José María Luis Mora. Lourdes Roca, a historian there, used about 30 aerial photographs from 1932 to 1978 to study the changes around the intersection of Paseo de la Reforma and Avenida Juárez, where the equestrian statue of Charles IV known as El Caballito ('the little horse') stood for nearly 150 years. She used the case to set out a method for working with aerial photographs as primary sources in urban history.

Krieger reads the city views as a record of Mexican modernity in constant change. He notes that politicians and builders first used them to plan their projects, and he picks out a view of the Viaducto Miguel Alemán as an image of the modern city the planners wanted. In a 2022 UNAM master's thesis supervised by Krieger, Ariadna Casas Ortiz looked at Aerofoto's 1965 oblique photographs of the new Nonoalco-Tlatelolco housing complex. She argues that they worked as propaganda for the city government of Ernesto P. Uruchurtu and its idea of an orderly modern city.

María del Carmen León García of the Instituto Nacional de Antropología e Historia (INAH) presents the collection as a tool for the history of Mexican street plans. An INAH Morelos publication used oblique views from a 1933 flight to look at the Gualupita district of Cuernavaca and the then new Casino de la Selva.

In July 2019 UNAM rector Enrique Graue Wiechers and the foundation's chairman, Bernardo Quintana Isaac, signed an agreement opening the archive to UNAM's teaching and research. Two further agreements covered a project on reducing seismic risk to historic buildings with the help of aerial photography, advised by the engineer Roberto Meli, and a study of the 16th- to 19th-century university quarter of the historic center. According to the magazine Chilango, not even the national statistics agency INEGI has so complete a record, as copies of aerial photographs taken in Mexico only had to be deposited with the government from 1970 on.

== Other holdings of Fundación ICA ==
Besides the aerial photographs, the foundation's archive holds the ICA Collection, about 1.8 million analog and digital photographic items on ICA's construction work since 1947. There are also about 136,000 microfiches of plans for the Mexico City Metro, a library of technical reports and engineering books, and an audiovisual collection with 189 films made between 1952 and 1980. Artworks commissioned by ICA are kept there too, among them Francisco Eppens's 1964 mural Historia mural de la construcción en México and Luis Nishizawa's Hombre ICA (1991).

== See also ==
- Aerial photography
- National Collection of Aerial Photography
- Memory of the World Programme
