= Torre del Caballito =

Torre Caballito
- The building in 2025. To the left, it lies El Caballito
- Interactive map of the Torre Caballito area

General information
- Type: Office
- Location: Paseo de la Reforma, Mexico City
- Coordinates: 19°25′27″N 99°10′32″W
- Construction started: 1980
- Completed: 1988
- Owner: Fibra Mexicana de Inmuebles (FIBRAMEX)
- Management: FIBRAMEX

Height
- Roof: 135 m (443 ft)

Technical details
- Floor count: 34
- Floor area: 60,340 m^{2} (649,500 sq ft)
- Lifts/elevators: 13

Torre del Caballito is a skyscraper located on the Paseo de la Reforma #10 at the Cuauhtemoc delegation in Mexico City. It was designed by Grupo Posadas de Mexico. It is 135 metres (443 feet) and 35 storeys tall. 33 of the floors are used as office space which measures 60,000 square meters. It also has 15 underground parking levels. The building's total area is 131,000 square meters.

The building houses the offices of MPs and senators. Torre Prisma, Edificio El Moro, the Melia Mexico Reforma Hotel, and the Fuente de la República are located nearby.

The building is equipped with 20 high-speed elevators which move at 6.3 meters per second.

In 1978 construction began with an ambitious project of a hotel which would have stood 220 metres 60 floors tall and have 700 rooms. It would be owned by the Holiday Inn chain. Due to Mexico's unstable political and economic conditions, construction was stopped several times. The works resumed in 1984 with the central concrete structure reaching 40 meters high. The metallic-structure assembly began but all works stopped again for a year. Works were delayed further when the main crane and some concrete elements were partially destroyed by the 1985 Mexico City earthquake. The damaged crane was moved away and the hotel project was cancelled altogether. In 1987, the damaged concrete and steel components were repaired and the height was shortened to 134 metres and by the end of 1988 construction was completed at last with a black mirror facade covering the structure.

Due to Mexico City's high propensity to earthquakes, the tower incorporates several anti-earthquake measures such as the inclusion of 70 seismic shocks. It is anchored to the ground with 185 concrete piles which penetrate 60 meters surpassing the old swampy landfill lake below Mexico City.

The tower could support other 25 floors if needed, though it is not planned to do so.

The building is currently owned by Fibra Mexicana de Inmuebles (FIBRAMEX).
