= Celebration of Mexican political anniversaries in 2010 =

Mexican anniversary celebrations

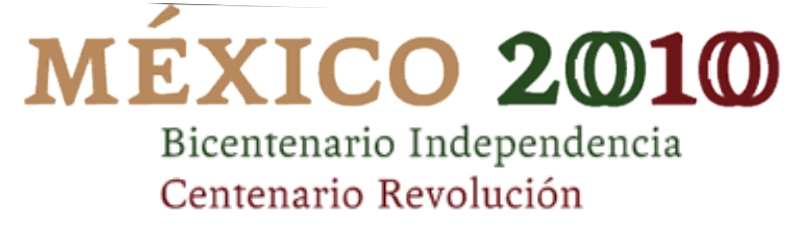
Official logo.

In 2010, Mexico celebrated both the 200th anniversary of its Independence and 100th anniversary of its Revolution. The entire year was proclaimed by President Felipe Calderón as "Año de la Patria", or "Year of the Nation". 16 September 1810 is the day of the "Grito de Dolores" or Miguel Hidalgo's call to take up arms against the Spanish colonial government. The start of the Mexican Revolution is celebrated as being 20 November 1910, when Francisco "Pancho" Villa and Pascual Orozco led the first insurrectionist attack against the regime of Porfirio Díaz. Events and other promotions of these celebrations were designed to link of Mexico's identity and historic continuity. During a speech at the inauguration of the Casa de Allende (Allende House) Historic Museum, President Felipe Calderón called upon Mexico to use the upcoming anniversaries to reflect on where the country has been and to think about what kind of Mexico descendants will inherit in the future. He said the vision of the insurgents of the War of Independence was forward, not backward, so every celebration of these past events must consider the future as well.

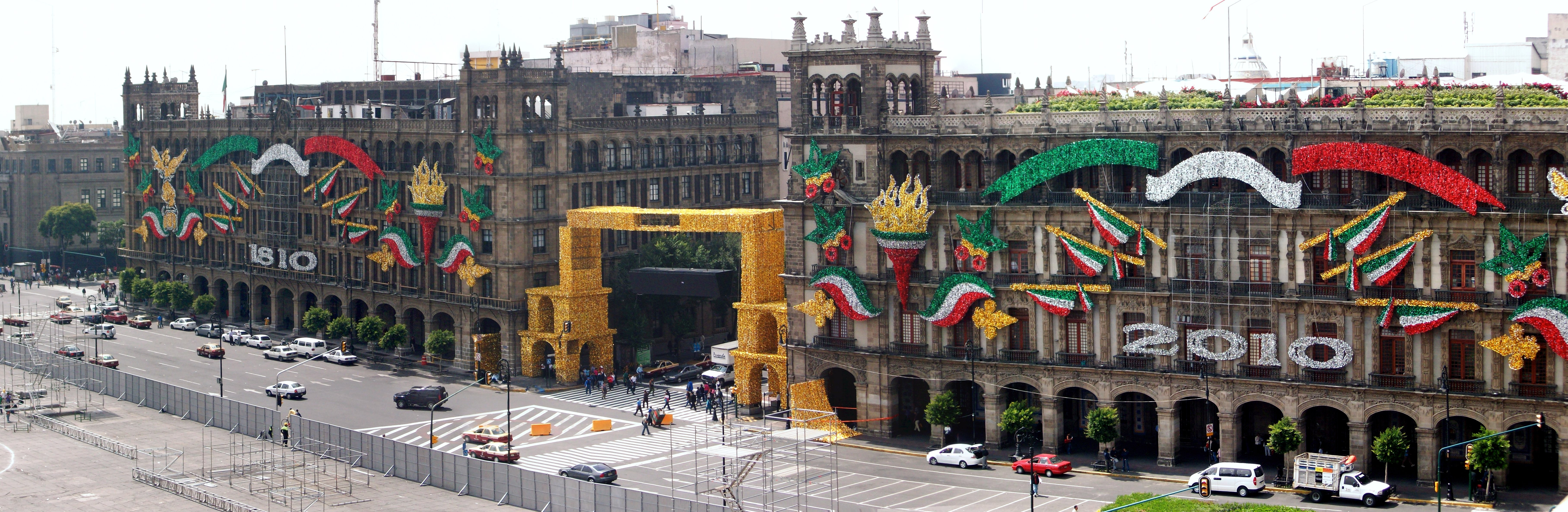
Federal District buildings at the Zócalo in Mexico City decorated for the 2010 celebrations as seen from the rooftop restaurant of the Hotel Majestic.

== 16 September and 20 November dates ==
The two dates represent the beginning of the Mexican War of Independence and Mexican Revolution respectively. The anniversary of the War of Independence is called "El Grito" (The Shout or The Cry) and takes place at 11 pm on 15 September, with the following day 16 September officially marking Mexico's Independence. El Grito is a re-enactment of the call made by Miguel Hidalgo y Costilla in Dolores Hidalgo, Guanajuato at around 6 am on 16 September 1810 to his parish to take up arms against the Spanish colonial government. Each year, this re-enactment occurs not only on the main square (Zócalo) of the capital, Mexico City, but also on every main plaza in almost all communities in the country.

The date of 20 November is used to mark the start of the Mexican Revolution, or the uprising and civil war that took place from 1910 to 1920. Presidential contender Francisco I. Madero chose the date in his Plan of San Luis Potosí to begin an uprising against President Porfirio Díaz who had thrown Madero in jail rather than accept his victory in the elections of 1910. Although violence against the Díaz regime had already broken out in the name of this Plan, the date is still considered official.

== Preparations ==
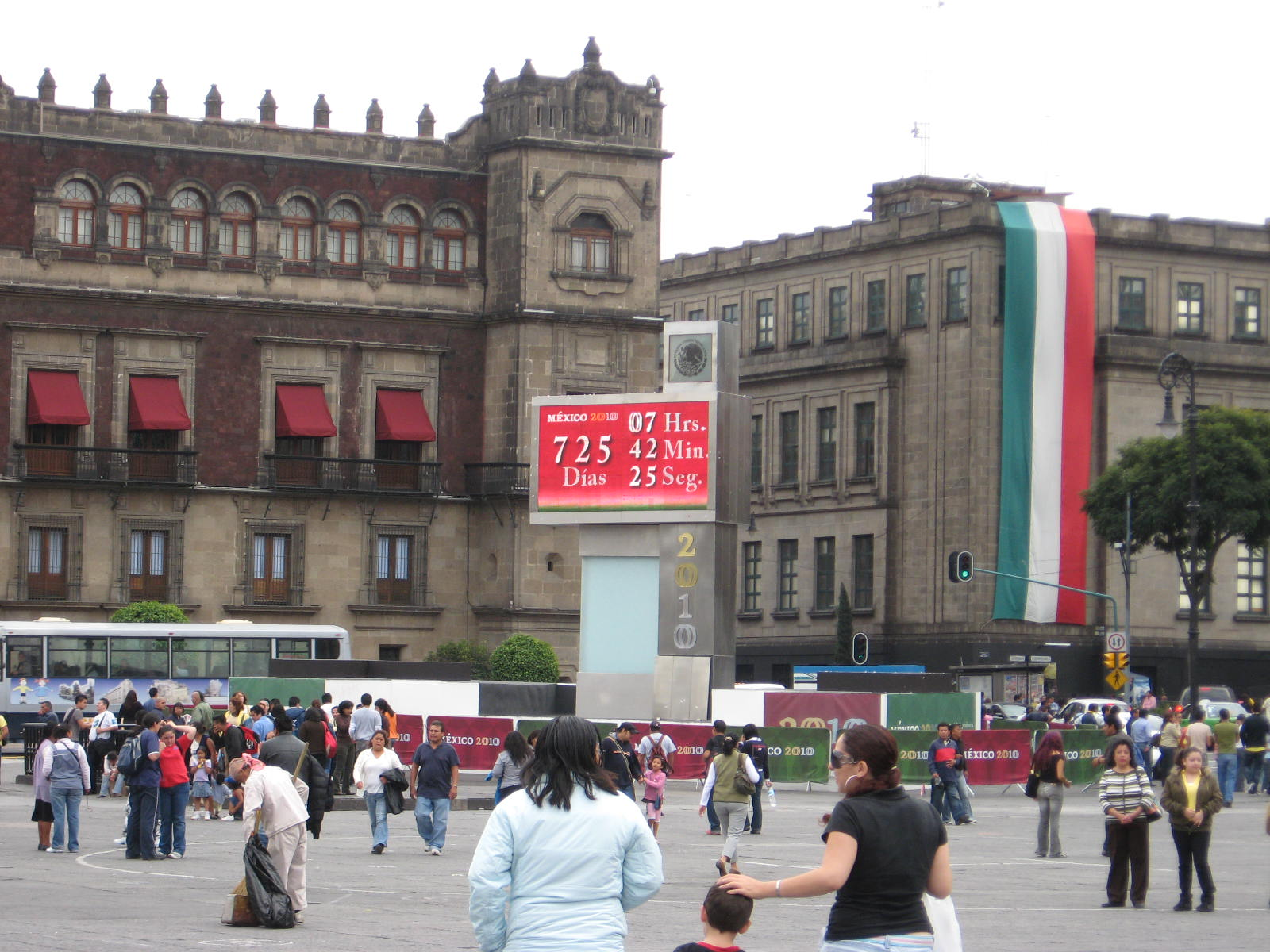
The first countdown clock on the Zocalo. The current one hangs over where 20 de Noviembre Street meets the Zocalo.

The national committee to organize celebrations for both events was created by decree in March 2006 by President Vicente Fox, after Congress declared that the year 2010 should be dedicated equally to both anniversaries. Eventually, the committee came under the direction of Felipe Calderón. Calderón officially installed the Organizing Committee of the Commemoration of the Bicentennial of the Start of the Movement of National Independence and Centennial of the Start of the Revolution in March 2007. In 2007, at the 97th anniversary of the Mexican Revolution, Calderón presented the Base Program of the Commemoration of the Bicentennial of the Start of Independence and the Centennial of the Start of the Mexican Revolution. Most preparations revolved around construction and reconstruction projects as well as planning for events related to 2010. Many of these commemorations were planned for venues outside of Mexico such as in Mexico's 147 diplomatic missions in the world. Mexico is also involved with the Grupo Bicentenario de Latinoamérica (Latin American Bicentennial Group). Programs and activities were coordinated among a number of countries for between 2009 and 2011 as many Latin American countries celebrate their bicentennials. This nations include countries such as Argentina, Bolivia, Chile, Colombia, Ecuador, El Salvador, Paraguay and Venezuela coordinating events such as debates, publications, celebrations and festivals. In various cities in Spain, the city sponsored an exposition called "Ciudad de México, Ciudad solidaria, Capital de asilos" (Mexico City: Capital of Solidarity, Capital of asylum), consisting mostly of Instamatic photographs. It looked back on the country's role as a refuge for political refugees from fascists regimes of World War II as well as from other Latin American countries. In addition to preparations by the federal government, most state governments began similar preparations as well, especially the state of Guanajuato, which is the site of Dolores Hidalgo and El Grito.

On 6 September 2009, Felipe Calderón lit the "Fuego Bicentenario" or Bicentennial Fire in front of the National Palace. This flame traveled all around Mexico over the next twelve months, ending on the date of the Bicentennial of Independence. Media events to promote the upcoming celebrations as well as to retell the stories of both historical events appeared on Mexican television. One example of this was "Expedición 1808, travesía por los bicentenarios de Iberoamérica" (Expedition 1808: a journey through the Bicentennials of Latin America) In Mexico State, six cities were declared "Bicentennial Cities", and slated for improvements in their industrial zones, roadways, parks and public space. In Guerrero, the National Institute of Anthropology and History is working to declare the entire old downtown of Chilpancingo as a historic site, due to the multiple events of both the War of Independence and the Revolution that occurred there.

In the Zocalo (main square) in Mexico City a large digital clock counted down to 15 September 2010 and 20 November 2010 dates. Similar countdown clocks were located in the cities of Cuernavaca, Tlaxcala, Chilpancingo, Tepic, Nayarit. and all the other capital cities of the 31 states.

== Projects associated with the Bicentennial ==
=== Commemorative routes ===
The most visible preparation to date in Mexico itself is the appearance of "Ruta 2010" signs on many of the nation's highways and roads in most Mexican states. These routes have been created to link monuments related to the two events as well as movements of armies and other key players of both the Bicentennial and Centennial. The Secretariat of Communications and Transportation is in charge of allocating resources to signal these roads and provide tourist information both on their website and on the roads themselves. These routes connect historical sites like the Casa del Marqués in the historic center of Mexico City, the San Diego Fort Museum in Acapulco, the Museum of the Viceroyalty in Tepotzotlán, the National Museum of Anthropology, the National History Museum, the Casa de Allende Museum, the Casa Morelos Museum, the Alhóndiga de Granaditas and the Museum of the Casa of Padre Hidalgo.

These roads are subdivided by the specific event they trace. The Independence Road, which includes the Freedom Route, follows the path of Miguel Hidalgo y Costilla from Dolores Hidalgo, Guanajuato, to the state of Chihuahua, passing through a number of other states such as Querétaro and Michoacán. This road traces the first campaigns of the War of Independence to the site of Hidalgo's execution. The Sentiments of the Nation Route, named after the eponymous document by José María Morelos y Pavón, follows his campaigns through the states of Michoacán, Guerrero, Oaxaca, Morelos, Mexico State, Puebla, Veracruz and Chiapas. The Route of the Three Guarantees maps out the campaigns fought by Agustín de Iturbide, who brought the War for Independence to a successful close in 1821. The runs from Iguala, Guerrero, to Mexico City.

Routes following the major events of the Mexican Revolution include the Democracy Route, mostly outlining the road taken by Francisco I. Madero from Ciudad Juárez to Mexico City after being elected president in 1911. The route starts in Parras, Coahuila, his hometown, and passes through the cities of San Luis Potosí, Ciudad Juárez, Piedras Negras, Torreón, Zacatecas, Aguascalientes and León. The Zapatista Route traces the operations of Emiliano Zapata's forces through the states of Morelos, Puebla and Mexico State. The Constitutionalist Revolution Route is the conjunction of the routes of Venustiano Carranza, Álvaro Obregón, Pancho Villa and Pablo González Garza, four other key players of the Revolution. These routes go through just about all of the northern and central states.

=== Infrastructure projects ===
Physical preparations in the city include a Commemorative Arch on Paseo de la Reforma, the new Mexican Children's Library, a Virtual Museum, the movement of the General Archive of the Nation to a new building. The Turkish government is restoring a clock given to Mexico for its Centennial celebrations by the Ottoman Empire.

As of August 2009, most of the preparations consisted of restoring historical buildings and sites related to the Bicentennial or the Centennial. Museums in Guanajuato state such as the Casa de Allende Museum, the Museum of Dolores Hidalgo, and the Alhóndiga de Granaditas have been remodeled and/or inaugurated at a cost of seven million pesos. In Querétaro, the 688,925 m^{2} (170-acre) The new "Bicentennial Park" was inaugurated in the north of the capital. In Mexico State, six cities were declared "Bicentennial Cities", and slated for improvements in their industrial zones, roadways, parks and public space. In Guerrero, the National Institute of Anthropology and History is working to declare the entire old downtown of Chilpancingo as a historic site, due to the multiple events of both the War of Independence and the Revolution that occurred there. The state of Nuevo León had 156 projects related to the two anniversaries and the state of Chihuahua will be celebrating the 300th anniversary of its capital city along with the other two.

In the restoration projects, the Casa Allende Museum was the first museum to be restored in the Bicentennial celebration. It took two years and seven million pesos. Its doors closed in October 2007 and started its restoration. This museum reopened its doors and was reinaugurated by Mexican president Felipe Calderón in April 2009. The museum has now a new water pipe system and a draining system, some electric improvements, a new security system and a new illumination for the whole museum.[9]

Another important restoration project is found in the Alondiga de Granaditasa, the building where the first encounter took place. The Alondiga Granaditasa was restored with a 5.7 million pesos donation from Mexico's Anthropology Institute. Improvements to this symbolic museum include drainage pipes, restroom facilities, site illumination, and security cameras. The Granaditasa Museum has many galleries and writings from the national heroes.[10]

There has been an infrastructure project to celebrate the Mexican bicentennial. It is called "Ruta 2010", and it is about six new routes. These routes are for Mexicans to understand the meaning and importance of the historical zones in past years. They are also made for Mexicans to enjoy faster and more efficient access to new places. Three of these routes follow the independence movement took place in 1810 that and the other three follow the revolutionary movement of 1910.

This project is a cooperation of many Departments of State. The Transportation and Communication department will destine a big part of its resources to install any necessary sign on the correct roadways. The Tourism Department will cooperate with the correct information for Mexicans and Tourists to be informed. This information will announce all the new strategic access points in the new roadways. The "Instituto Nacional de Antropología e Historia" (INAH) will also reinforce its facilities in those places where museums, sites and monuments are located. This is to have a stronger Presence on those places that are historically more significant.

Many facts were taken into consideration in order to create these routes. Previously, there was not enough access to these historical zones, since many of them are very remote. There was not access through free roads, not even through "private roads" in which Mexicans pay a fee to use them. Therefore, Government decided to set out these routes, so that Mexicans can have easier and faster access and visit the most important historical places in the country.

There is a project called "Mexico es mi Museo", it is an important part of the infrastructure project. This project is about the installation of special signs called "Mexico es mi Museo" (Mexico is my museum). These signs will be located at the most important historical places. The objective of this is to invite Mexicans and tourists to visit museums and get to know better the place in which they are located. This is also for them to understand the role that the place played during the independence and revolutionary movements.

There is historical and geographical information available on the official Mexican Bicentennial website. There is also available information for Communication routes and touristic places. People can also call a free number in order to hear more information about the infrastructure project in just a few minutes. Since many of the historical places had a different name in the past, there are guides with the past names and the current names of these places for better reference. There are also maps with the location of these places.

=== Other projects ===
Parque Bicentenario

The Bicentennial Park was one of the projects presented by the president Felipe Calderón: an ecological work inspired because of the Bicentennial of Mexico. The park has interactive museums, outdoor audience space, sports fields, bicycling paths, children's games, areas for persons of the third age, pedestrian zones, besides many green areas. The project was created to foment the cultural health in Mexicans, and particularly of the inhabitants of Azcapotzalco, Michael Hidalgo and part of the municipalities conurbados of the State of Mexico, the works are realized by the highest conditions of sanitary and environmental safety. The government has invested over two billion pesos. The president declared that this is an important project for the Mexican people because it is an environmental, urban and social park.

Corredor Madero

The head of government of the Federal District, Marcelo Ebrard, was one of the persons presented in the inauguration of the pedestrian corridor in Madero Street, located in the Center Históric. The chief of government of the Federal District describe those corridor as one of the most important of the city, this was a perfect example of how important is to recover public spaces. The secretary of Urban Development and Housing, Philip Leal, said that the project of peatonalización had an investment of almost 30 million. In they installed 130 new lights, 12 bankings, three modules of newspaper and 120 bolardos.

Bicentennial Arc

The project was presented by 24 Mexican architects. Cesar Perez Becerril was the head of the project. The monument was raised on Walk of the Reform, at a height of the gratings of The Lions, of Chapultepec's Forest. This monument represents every hardship Mexico has endured and the dreams of it's future.

=== Cultural projects ===
Highlighted among the many projects designed exhibits of pre-Hispanic, Spanish, modern and contemporary Mexican art at the most important capitals of the world, historic routes, shows, publications, seminars, the opening of 10 new archeological sites, maintenance to the country's most important pre-Hispanic sites and the remodeling of thirty museums. This work involves a complex museography and the consolidation of historic buildings in six states to commemorate the Independence and historic buildings in eight states to commemorate the Revolution, with a budget of over 300 million pesos.

=== TV & movie projects ===
The television network Televisa is producing a historical "television-novel" to commemorate the Bicentennial, which will be titled "Senda de gloria" or "Path of Glory". It is produced with the cooperation of the Office of the President of Mexico. More academically, one of the major projects is the publication of a fourteen-volume work discussion how Mexico has arrived at the 21st century, written by more than 100 researchers from the El Colegio de México. One of the volumes is a Dictionary of the Spanish of Mexico, another is an analysis of Mexico's condition in the 21st century and a number are devoted to the history of each of the states and the economy of the country.

Another production of Televisa group is the television-novel called "Gritos de muerte y libertad" based in the Mexican history with the objective of commemorating. This production was supported by recognized historians like Héctor Aguilar Camín, Javier García Diego, Enrique Flores Cano and Rafael Rojas. The production by thirteen chapters with the collaboration of actors like Alejandro Tommasi and Diego Luna. It was premiered on 30 August and ended on 16 September and it was well received by critics, counting with a good budget and showing different parts of the country like Texcoco, Dolores Hidalgo and Guanajuato.

One of the biggest projects are the "Bicentennial Olympics". It consists of a series of sporting events, swimming, table tennis and basketball. The inauguration was in Reforma Avenue in Mexico City. Michael Phelps was invited to a race in the inauguration of this Olympics, as well as many other famous and important athletes.

As part of the commemorations of the Bicentennial of Independence and the Mexican Revolution, the Mexican Navy has a traveling exhibition of these topics. The exhibition began on 7 January in the city of Querétaro where through screens are various topics such as stages of the movement of 1810, which shows the various campaigns of the priest Miguel Hidalgo y Costilla and many other characters involved in this movement.

=== Museum Exhibits ===
President Calderon declared that concept of the project México es mi museo (lit. Mexico is my museum) is to "turn the country into the biggest museum in the world." This aim of the project is to educate the public on Mexican history.

== List of Events ==
=== Mexico City ===
On the night of 15 September 2010 around a million people gathered at the "Zocalo" and "Angel de la Independencia" to celebrate two hundred years of freedom.

The Angel of the Independence hosted a parade of popular young musicians like Aleks Syntek, Paulina Rubio, Ely Guerra and Natalia Lafourcade. Thousands of persons took advantage of the opportunity of seeing closely to his idols and of step to enjoy the native holidays The director of the Philharmonic Orchestra of the Americas, Alondra de la Parra, was the one that began to the concert in The Angel on the occasion of the Bicentenary and Centenary of the Revolution. Lo Blondo and Ely Guerra were the first ones invited in rising to the scene and parting with the rock that it characterizes them they gave voice to the topic " Only once ". Within a few minutes, Natalia Lafourcade joined the duet and already as soloist I continue the recital with the Jose Alfredo Jiménez's classic one " I dawned again ".

The change of pace came when the DJ Alyosa Barreiro, offered a set of electronic music and opened to Aleks Syntek, not without before, the drivers Julio Bracho and Vanessa Bauche invited to the hearing to mention them the mother the assistants in the events carried out in the "Zocalo" and in the statue of "El Caballito".

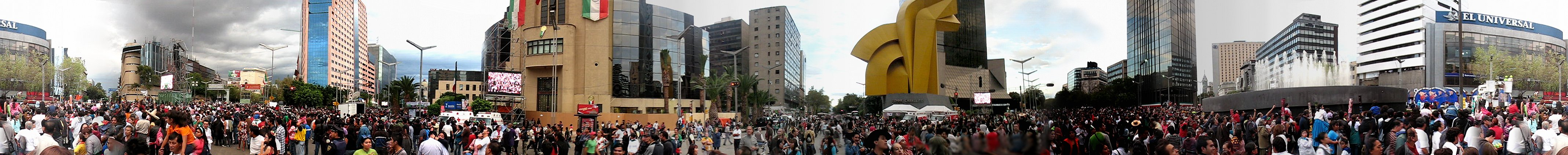
Panoramic view of the parade of the Bicentenary of Mexico at the Torre del Caballito, Paseo de la Reforma corner of Avenida Juarez, 15.09.2010

The celebrations of the two hundred anniversary of the National Independence at the "Zocalo" began at 5 pm with the "Ritual del Fuego" ceremony in which around 40 grandfathers of different regions of the country participated. After the ritual tree "mariachi" groups and a theater group arrived and performed typical songs of the Mexican culture. Two different shows were presented after this. (Arbol de la Vida and Vuela Mexico) The "Arbol de la Vida" show had its own stage and through different figures of the independence heroes they represented different aspects and moments of Mexico's history. "Vuela Mexico" was an acrobatic number were the dancers formed the word Mexico using their bodies. At 11:00 pm, like all the years, the celebration was interrupted and the president, Felipe Calderón Hinojosa, appeared and received from the hands of a military escort the flag of Mexico and then walked to the balcony where he rang the liberty bell, remembered and yelled all the independence heroes' names and then rang the bell again. At 11:05 the national anthem was played and all the people gathered sang along. Everything was followed by the bicentennial firework show that amazed all the people. At 11:30 Armando Manzanero appeared with the Yucalpeten Orchestra to perform his hits and closed all the celebrations at the Zocalo.

Miguel Hidalgo and Benito Juarez sectors are two of the main celebration points in Mexico City. In Benito Juarez sector, activities start with an official ceremony to Mexico's national flag. At night the sector's governor made the traditional "grito de independencia" to recall the memory of Mexican independence heroes. The events at this sector of the city consisted of coordinated civic events, which had a military ceremony style. In Miguel Hidalgo sector, there was a vast set of cultural performances: the Mexican dance company "Itlatiuh", then the "Sonora Dinamita" and the "Zona Rica", both popular music bands. The event will have the assistance of the orchestras and folklorikal ballets. Like in every traditional celebration there were mariachis, which come right before the "grito". The governor of this sector algos gives the "grito de independencia". The events at Miguel Hidalgo have the style of popular cultural events, so they differ a little from the ones in Benito Juarez.

A celebratory military parade took place on 16 September 2010 in the presence of President Felipe Calderón. The parade began at 11:00 am with the free fall of 27 paratroopers, 12 from the Navy and 15 from the army. The parade had the participation of 18,000 soldiers of the Mexican army, Navy and the Air Force. Military formations from Germany, Argentina, Brazil, Canada, Colombia, China (Beijing Garrison Honor Guard Battalion), Colombia, El Salvador, Spain, the United States (United States Military Academy), France (École spéciale militaire de Saint-Cyr), Guatemala, Honduras, Nicaragua, Russia (154th Preobrazhensky Independent Commandant's Regiment), Peru and Venezuela also participated in the parade. 242 vehicles, 326 horses, and 121 airplanes from the Mexican Air Force took part in the parade. 219 women, 240 elements from Mexican Air Force, 1556 combat troop elements, 2867 students and seven vehicles of military traveled the path by foot. From the Mexican Navy's 5 thousandth 2 hundredth elements participated in the parade and 636 from the Public Security Secretary. 326 elements of the cavalry división and 100 "charros" traveled the circuit to close the parade.

=== Northern Mexico ===
The Bicentennial celebrations of the Mexican War of Independence took place all over the country on 15 and 16 September 2010. Celebrations were different in every state, depending on each one's traditions and culture. Northern states, such as Sonora and Chihuahua, had similar celebrations, as well as Baja California Sur (BCS) and Baja California Norte (BCN). All of the local governments of those states made public works like remodeling historic areas and organizing military parades. For example, in Sonora for the parade they reconstructed the "Bicentenario Plaza" to make the principal ceremony there. Although all northern states had similar celebrations, each one gave a traditional local touch to the Bicentennial events.

For the northern states near the Distrito Federal, celebrations were a bit different from other parts of the country, but as important as the main festivity in the capital. In Morelia, Michoacán, after the attack in 2008 of an offender group at the ceremony of "el Grito de Independencia", the government established severer security measures this year. An example of this was the use of metal detectors and the presence of the Mexican Army. In Querétaro, the traditional ceremony was performed without conflicts. Some majors began the ceremonies earlier and also took out the prohibition of alcohol. In Dolores Hidalgo, Guanajuato, which was the Cradle of Independence, the president Felipe Calderón re-acted the traditional "Grito" by saying the original dialogue that Miguel Hidalgo y Costilla proclaimed two hundred years ago. Finally, Coahuila and Colima organized the traditional ceremony with music, dances, fireworks and parties in all the municipalities throughout these five states.

Many states of the northwestern area celebrated Bicentennial festivities by organizing commemorative parades. In places like Aguascalientes, Durango, Jalisco, and Nayarit the members of the Army attended the celebrations, but the participation of schools and security institutions characterized the parades. In Aguascalientes, the civic-military parade was made up by 2,040 elements from different schools, as well as 370 members of the Secretaría de Seguridad Pública y Tránsito. In Durango, there were more than 1,500 students from secondary, high school and professional levels, along with 68 professors. In the case of Jalisco, approximately 3,600 people participated, including soldiers, policemen, some members of the Secretaría de Seguridad Pública, etc. The Governor of Nayarit, Ney González, emphasized that it was because of children, youths and schools that the parade in the state succeeded.

In other northern states, such as Nuevo León, Tamaulipas, Coahuila, San Luis Potosí and Zacatecas, the respective governors started the Bicentennial celebrations with the traditional civic ceremony. First, they took possession of the patriotic symbol (flag) and then proceeded to give "el Grito de Independencia". In these events, the governors mentioned the names of some characters who participated in the War of Independence by saying: "Mexicanos, vivan los héroes que nos dieron patria; Viva Hidalgo; Viva Morelos; Viva Allende; Viva la Independencia; Viva México; Viva México; Viva México". Later, the celebrations were complemented with fireworks, which lasted from 30 to 45 minutes in most of the federal entities. Finally, the festivity concluded with the inauguration of different monuments, public buildings (hospitals), artistic expositions, and with the military march past.

=== South of the country ===
The south of Mexico includes: Tabasco, Veracruz, Guerrero, Oaxaca, Chiapas, Campeche, Quintana Roo, and Yucatán. In general those states celebrated, like the rest of the country, with the traditional "Grito"-the 15th- and a military parade-16 September-with a few distinguished traditions of each state; moreover, the celebrations distinguished by the presence of some political, and weather problems that limited the original plans.

In the state of Oaxaca, the "Grito" was given at 10:56 pm, in the Zocalo of the city. After the Mexican National Anthem was interpreted, the lights of fireworks illuminate the cathedral. 16 September began with the hoisting of flag, on the "Alameda de Leon". The civic-military parade began at 10 am starting from the park "El Llano" and ending in "Plaza del Zocalo". When the parade finished, the Mexican national anthem was sung by the voices of the thousands of people that attended to the Zocalo of the city.

In Chiapas the Bicentennial Celebration was very similar to Oaxaca. The "grito" was given in the night of 15 September and the military parade the following day. Moreover, Chiapas began its celebration before, because they also celebrate the fact that Chiapas had become an official state of the country at 14 September 1842. People get organized to set up a flower memorial in honor o Miguel Hidalgo y Costilla. The state that had similar parade as Chiapas was Veracruz which involved ten thousand three hundred participants. There were several marching bands from public school students. Much of the people were wearing the colors of the Mexican flag or were characterized like the significant "adelitas" (women in the Mexican Revolution). Also there was a live play involving the principal characters of the independence and the appearance of the special police which put up the show of rescuing by helicopter.

In Mérida, Yucatán people went to the "Monumento a la Patria" to celebrate Mexico's Bicentennial. From an early hour, people from Yucatán and tourists were walking around the "Paseo de Montejo" which is the most legendary part in the city to celebrate. The entertainment of the night was in charge of the singer Juan Gabriel, Mariachis and a Rock Band. In the hall event, there was the presence of the local and federal police, the Mexican Army, firefighters and the air force. In addition the mayor, governor, legislator and head chief were at the celebration.

In Guerrero the principal celebrations took place at the Plaza Civica were the people was entertained by a folk ballet, a play called "Hay que darle libertad al preso" (Lets gave freedom to the prisoner), and music from famous bands as La Sonora Dinamita.

The "grito" in Michoacán was given one hour and a half before of the rain but the authorities said that it was for the people, so they could see the celebrations on Mexico City. There were about 3000 people there. Since the attack of 2008, there was a big safety device with metal detectors and police dogs. The government distributed raincoats to the people present.

Tabasco was affected by Hurricane Karl and produced the overflow of the principal rivers. A lot of municipalities were declared emergency places and the celebrations were affected. Andrés Granier, governor of Tabasco, suspended the military parade that was going to take place at 16 September.

== Reflection ==
The twin events have led to reflections on the country's past and present. Luis Arriaga Valenzuela, the director of the human rights center "Centro de Derechos Humanos Miguel Agustín Pro Juárez, AC" in an article written for the Mexican newspaper "El Universal", pointed out that the Bicentennial represented an opportunity to make a reflection on the current situation of Mexico and the situation it had 200 years ago at the beginning of its independence. He considers that among the advances that Mexico has had in these 200 years, are: greater participation of the people, integration of marginalized groups, rights' organizations, etc. On the other hand, some problems persist and there are new ones for the list of problems. He says that the country side is abandoned, that the indigenous autonomy has not been recognized to the full, and that there is still imposition of certain projects that differs from the will of the communities. He also says that there is a lack of human right protection policies.

CNN reported that Mexico's bicentennial was an event that many people waited for several years. Despite this, they reported that many Mexican citizens felt that it was not a good year for celebration because of the problems Mexico has. Citizens were more concerned about the drug war that was taking place in the northern part of the country. Then, some of the Mexican states canceled celebrations. Mexico faced the economic world crisis, being the most affected country of Latin America. In terms of tourism, the nation is suffering a drop because of the violence and the flu pandemic of the previous year. The Mexican government put all their efforts in this celebration but the citizens just felt that it was because the government wanted them to forget the current situation of the country.

Time magazine published that after 200 years of the Mexican independence, Mexico had many reasons for celebration. The country had experienced development in economic, cultural, and political issues. In spite of this, Mexican citizens preferred to celebrate it in their homes and not on the local town squares. They were afraid of the insecurity problems that the nation is facing. In many parts of Mexico this celebration was muted by the different problems, especially the drug trafficking. Mexico hoped that the Revolution's centennial celebration would not be spoilt.

Considering the Mexican Bicentennial as a positive event is not correct from the perspective of some people. Mexico is first of all experiencing a drug war that" has taken more than 28,000 lives" within the last four years. For this reason, several bicentennial celebrations, particularly around the Mexican-U.S. border, have been canceled due to safety concerns. Other people criticize the fact of spending tens of millions of dollars that should "be better spent on schools, health care and other pressing social needs" the country has.

In fact, La Prensa interviewed several people who spoke about the "celebrations in an uninhabited nation" due to the fear and insecurity existing in a lot of northern and central villages in Mexico. The author also criticized that the bicentennial celebrations did not achieve what the country really needs: respect of the law and authority, the honest payment of taxes by the population and their general commitment to the nation.

Even if there are some criticisms about the Mexican's Bicentennial celebrations, some other people who were interviewed by La Prensa think that this event creates a "sense of unity" at a time when Mexicans are "living difficult times". They say that Mexicans precisely need these kinds of celebrations to "confront the problems" they are facing, and to come together.

Government authorities reported the assistance of over a million people that attended the celebrations due on 15 September in Paseo de la Reforma and Historic center. There were no incidents reported in all the different stages where shows were presented. Marcelo Ebrad thanked all public servants for their participation. There were no injuries and only 9 persons were arrested for carrying weapons, weed and sharp objects.

The Secretariat of Public Education (SEP) discussed the possibility of creating a Museum for the Bicentennial. The National Council for Culture and the Arts known as Conaculta, had been evaluating alternatives to see what to do with all the production of both the parade that took place along Paseo de la Reforma, and the show that was due in the Zocalo on 15 September. The reason why they were trying to create this museum is to show all the 7000 costumes used, 27 floats, more than a hundred puppets, the Colossus of 8 tons, 45 giant screens and more than 11 thousand 800 objects and materials used during the Bicentennial celebration of Independence that are now stored in warehouses of the Federal Government SEP had several meetings with the Administrative Office and with its legal department to specify which actions can be taken, within the bounds of the law.

The museum was finally created. The national gallery "Galeria de Palacio Nacional" was inaugurated on 20 September in the National Palace in Mexico City, during the celebration dates, showing an exhibition called "Mexico 200 años. La patria en construccion". According to the opinion of the man in charge of restoring and looking after the pieces of the exhibition, whose name is Miguel Ángel Fernandez, it is the right moment for Mexicans to make a reflection about these 200 years of independent life. When he was interviewed by the news agency Milenium, he said that Mexicans can make this reflection after having contact with the moments that led to the construction of the country. Fernandez also referred to the importance of the building where the exposition takes place, Palacio National, which is the location of the executive power, where the presidents carry on "El grito", and the bell of the independence is rung. He said that the building itself is emblematic. Then he quoted Diego Rivera on the building Placio Nacional:"It is the hearth of the Nation". The exhibition was full of symbols and patriotic content. It showed elements related to key moments and key personalities for the independence. It includes more than 550 historical pieces. Some examples are the independence act, the sword of Morelos (Independence leader) the image of the Virgin of Guadalupe that was used as an independence movement banner, and the fundamental document for the declaration of the independence, known as "Sentimientos de la Nación". Fernandez made a reflection in reference to the exhibition: "The exhibition is an emotive and marvelous way, but the construction of the nation do not ends now, this is why this gallery and this great exhibition exist".
