= El Caballito (Sebastián) =

Sculpture in Mexico City, Mexico

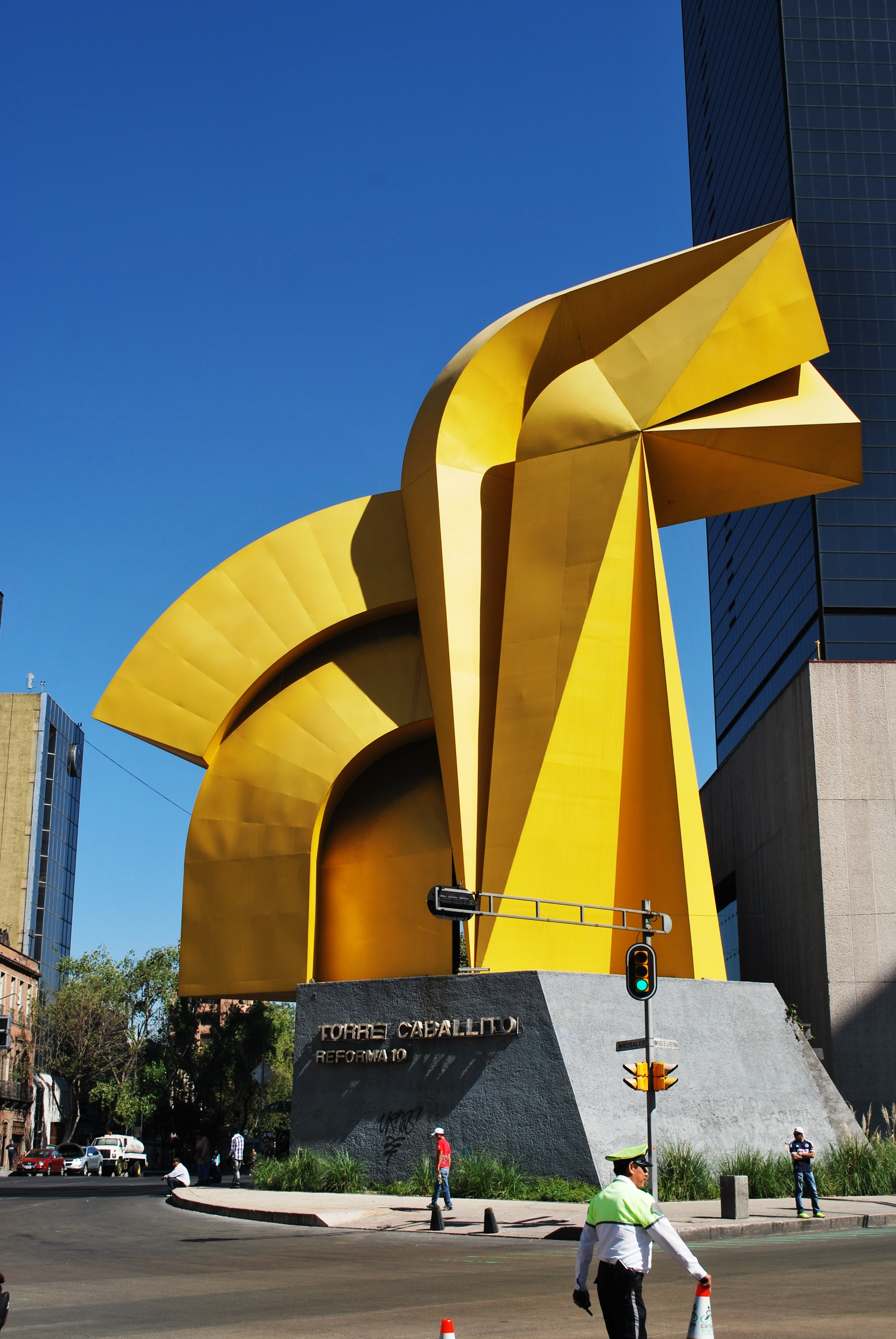
- The sculpture in 2011
- Location in Mexico City
- Artist: Sebastián
- Year: 1992
- Medium: Steel sculpture
- Location: Mexico City, Mexico; 19.43608559°N 99.14942711°W

El Caballito, officially Cabeza de caballo ("horse's head"), is an outdoor 28-metre (92 ft) tall steel sculpture by Sebastián (Enrique Carbajal) depicting a horse's head, installed along Mexico City's Paseo de la Reforma, in Mexico. It was dedicated on January 15, 1992.

Enrique Carbajal (Sebastian) created the El Caballito monument under the Olmec conception. The El Caballito was installed in front of the Torre del Caballito, a high office building. The monument had to replace the Equestrian statue of Carlos IV which was removed from there in 1979, and also had to be some kind of chimney that would dissipate the vapors from deep drainage but wouldn't adversely affect the image of the Paseo de la Reforma.

== See also ==
- Glorieta del Caballito
