= Avenida Juárez =

Avenue in Mexico City

Coordinates: 19.435174°N 99.147678°W

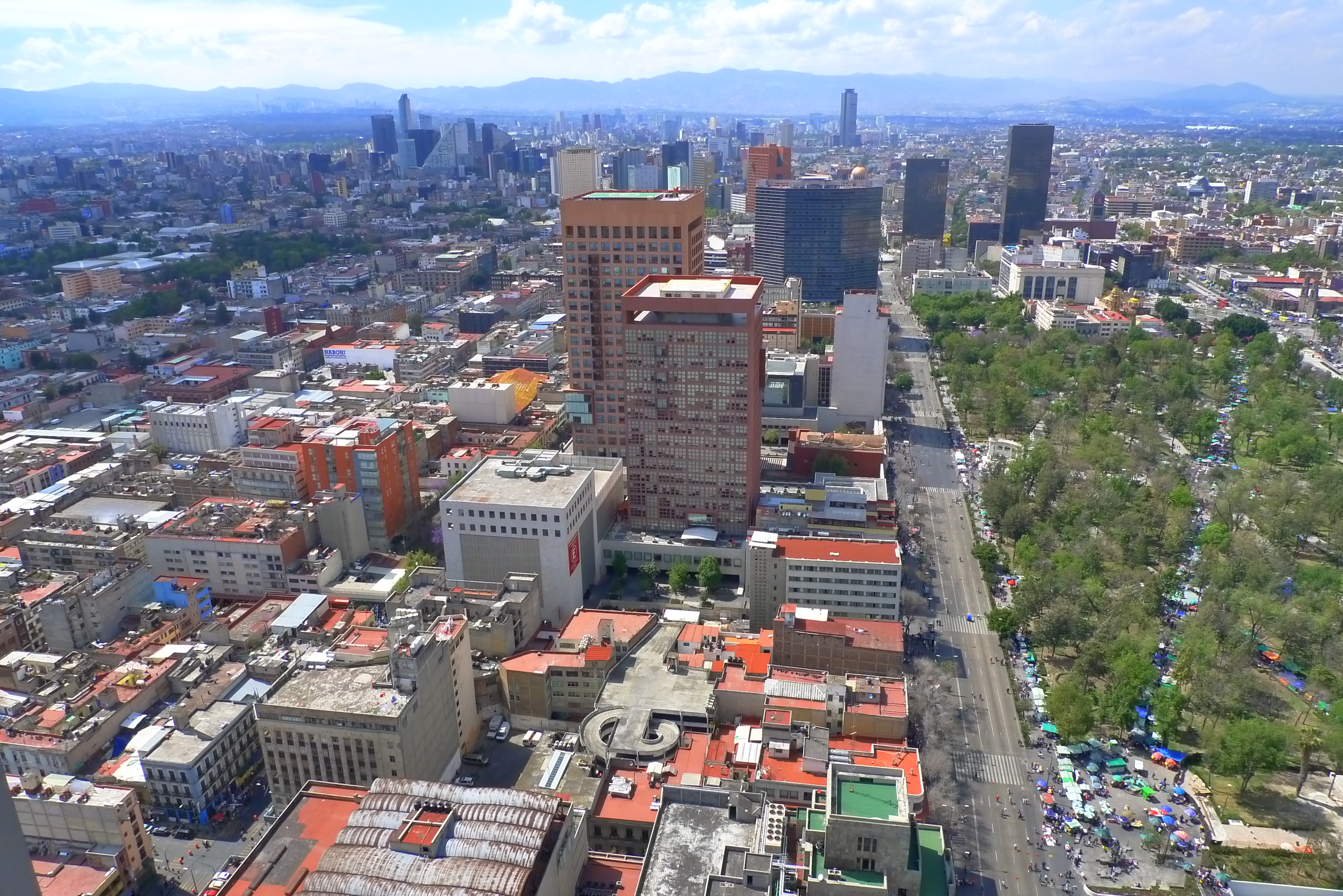
Avenida Juárez looking west from the Torre Latinoamericana

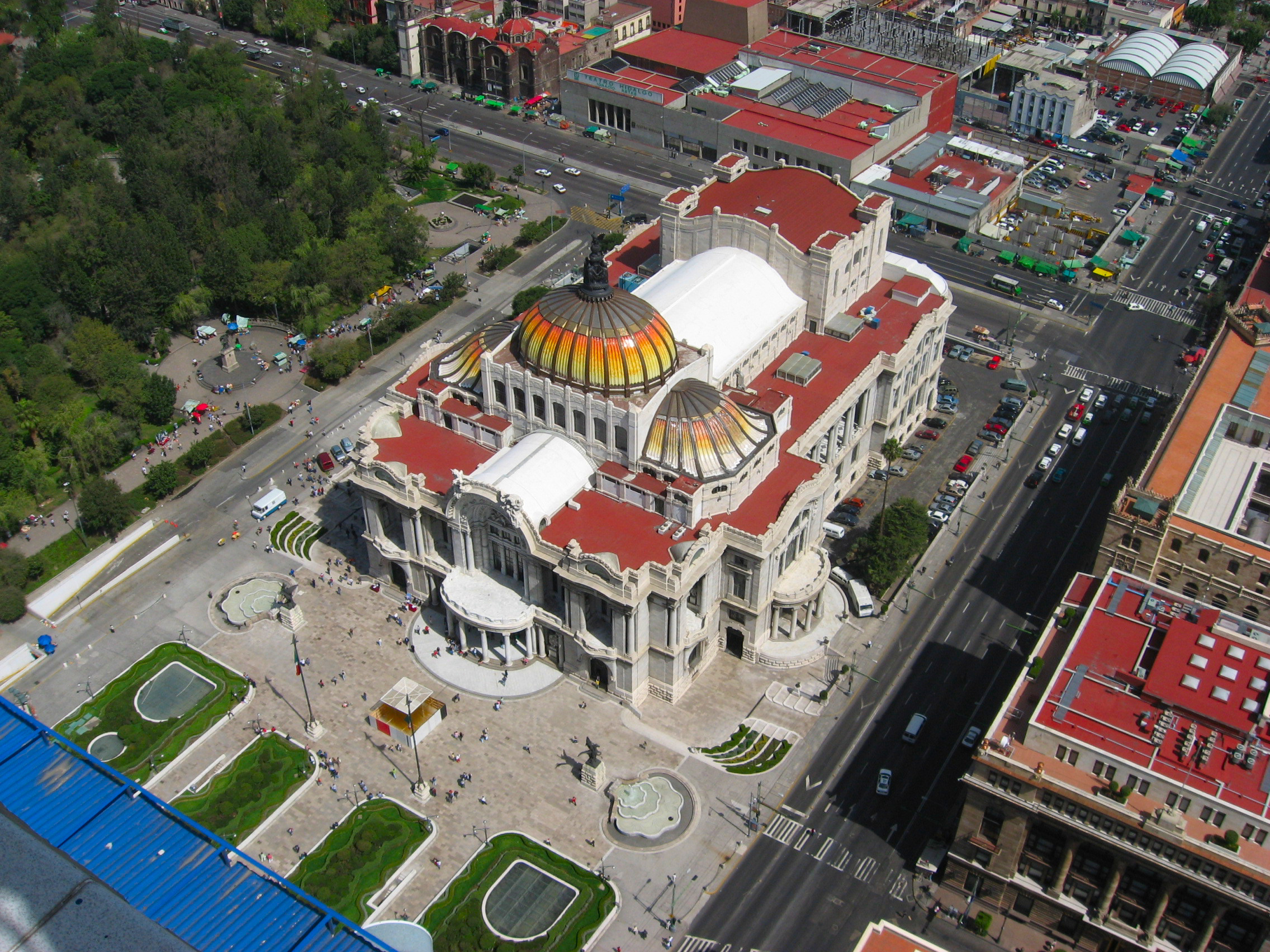
The Palacio de Bellas Artes which fronts Avenida Juárez

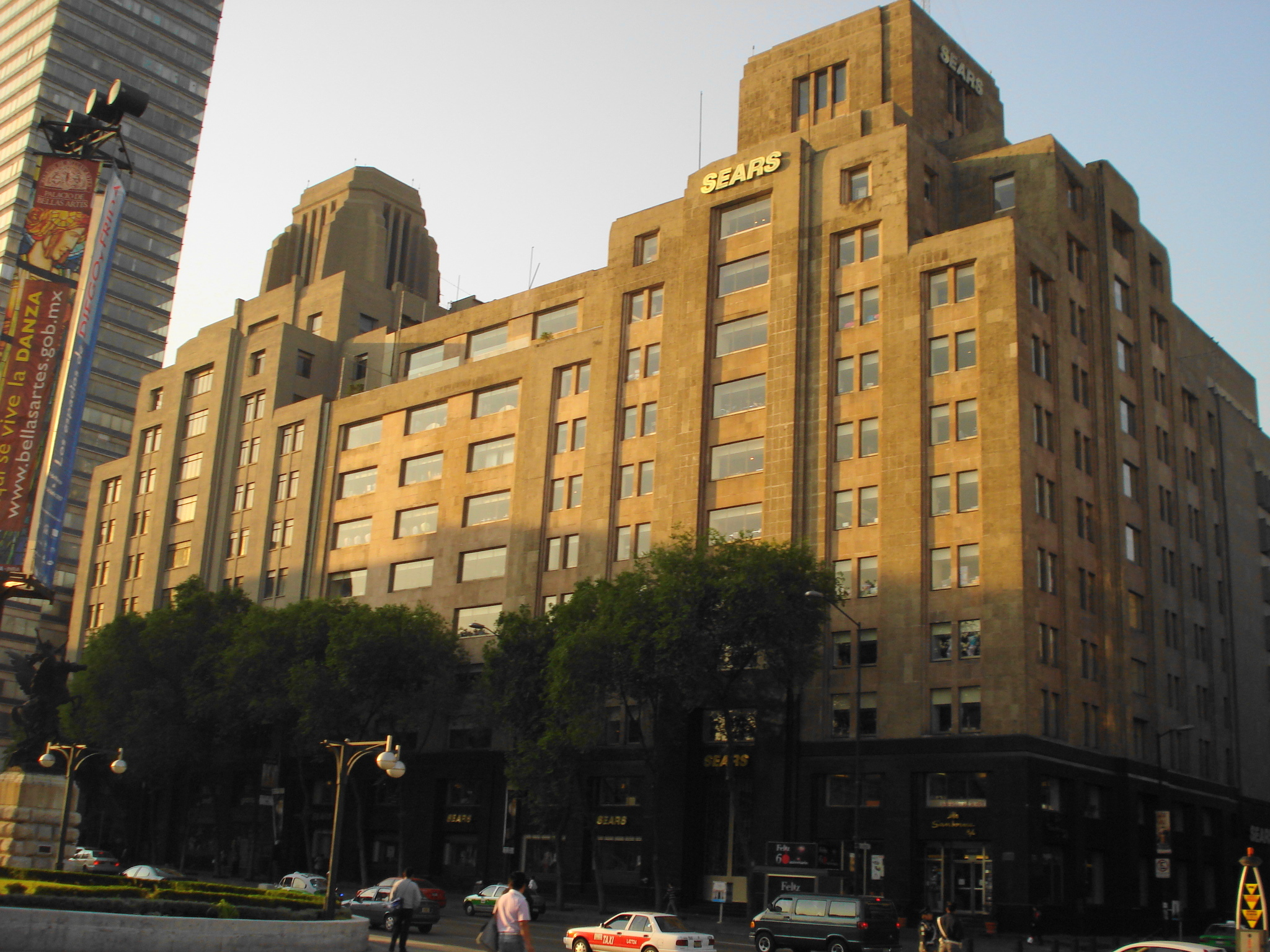
Edificio La Nacional on Avenida Juárez

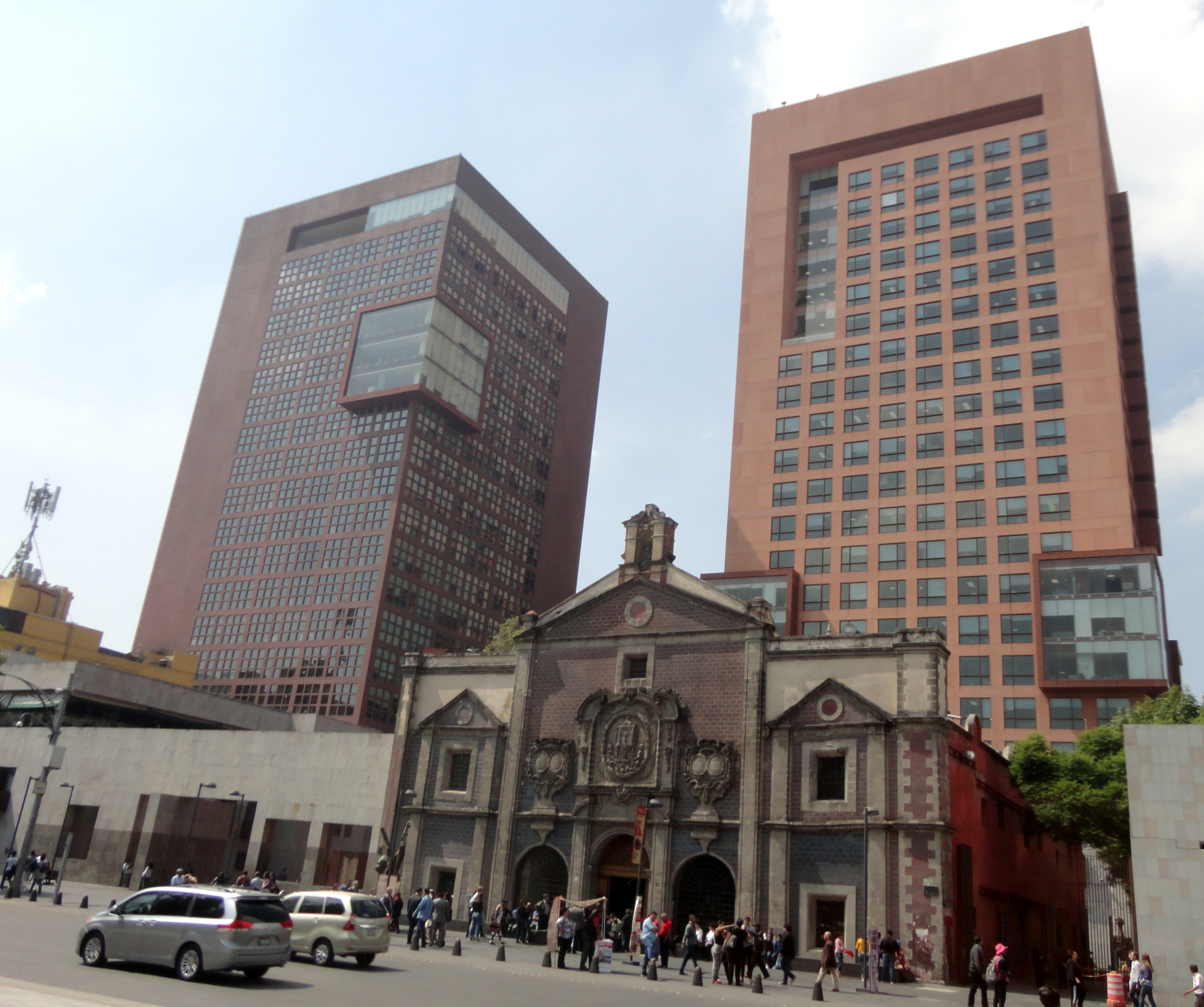
Complex on Avenida Juárez that includes the Secretariat of Foreign Affairs, the Museo Memoria y Tolerancia and a court

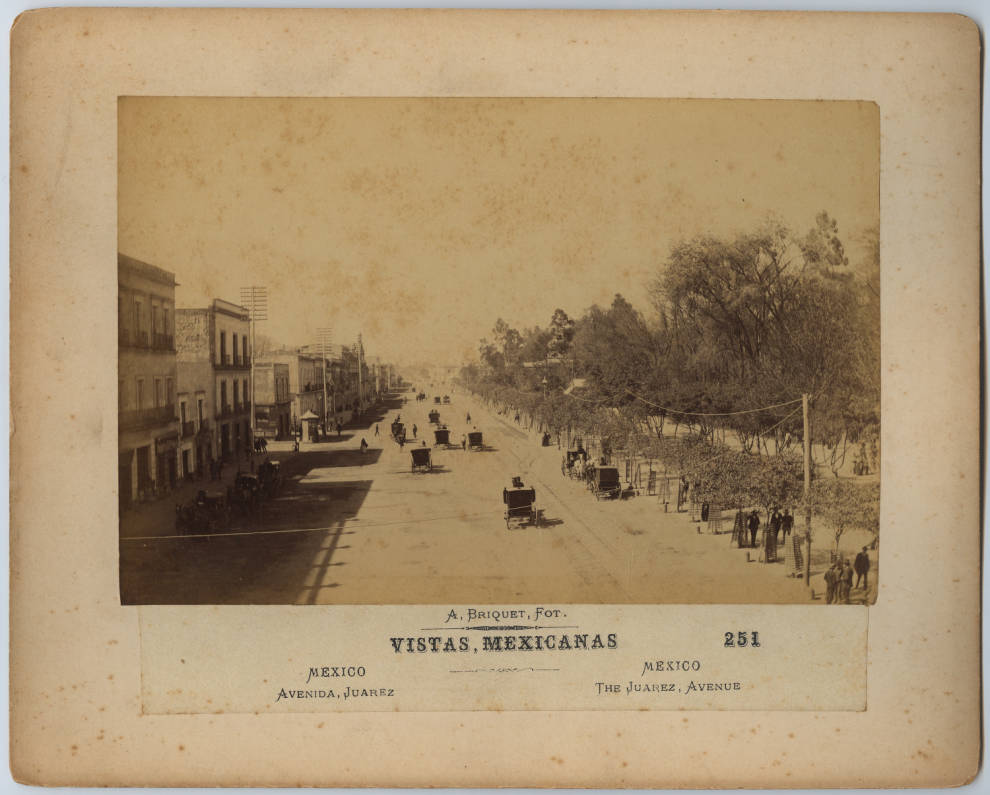
what is now Avenida Juárez, around 1880

Avenida Juárez is a street in the Historic Center of Mexico City flanking the south side of the centuries-old Alameda Central park.

Originally each block had a different name:

- Calle de la Puente de San Francisco between San Juan de Letrán (today Eje Central Lázaro Cárdenas) and López, in front of the Palacio de Bellas Artes
- Calle de Corpus Christi, between López and Nueva (today Luis Moya)
- Calle del Calvario, between Nueva (today Luis Moya) and San Diego (hoy Dr. Mora)
- Calle de Patoni between San Diego (today Dr. Mora) and Rosales/Bucareli/Paseo de la Reforma

During the 1940s through the 1960s it was one of the city's boulevards, lined with upscale shops and hotels.

In the 1985 Mexico City earthquake, the Alameda, Del Prado and Regis hotels collapsed or were torn down.

The street runs between the intersection of Paseo de la Reforma and Avenida Bucareli, marked by Sebastián's sculpture known as El Caballito, and Eje 1 Central, east of which it becomes Madero Street, the city's busiest pedestrian street.

== Buildings and points of interest ==
- Palacio de Bellas Artes
- Edificio La Nacional, which houses a Sears department store
- Museo Memoria y Tolerancia (Museum of Memory and Tolerance)
- Secretariat of Foreign Affairs
- Corpus Christi Church
- Hemiciclo de Juárez monument in the Alameda
- Hotel Bamer, built 1953
- Avenida Juárez no. #18 (built 1883 by Antonio Rivas Mercado, the same architect of the Angel of Independence), formerly Ignacio Torres Adalid's pulquería serving the pulque drink

== Former buildings ==
- "La Acordada" prison
- Pabellón Español
- Hotel Alameda
- Hotel Del Prado (built 1933–1946), original home of Diego Rivera's mural Sueño de una Tarde Dominical en la Alameda Central
- Hotel Regis, which "brought together the upper echelons of the city" and aimed at being the best hotel in Mexico. Included a theater, restaurants, bars, sauna, pharmacy, swimming pool, billiard halls. Favorite of politicians, artists, journalists, and businessmen. Visited by Venustiano Carranza, Frank Sinatra, Ava Gardner, Clark Gable, Richard Nixon, Fidel Castro, and Agustín Lara.
- Kiosko Morisco, later moved to the main square of Santa María la Ribera

== Transportation ==
Metro stations Balderas and Bellas Artes are adjacent to Avenida Juárez, as is the Hidalgo Metrobús (bus rapid transit) station serving lines 3, 4 and 7.
