= Equestrian statue of Charles IV of Spain =

Equestrian statue of Charles IV of Spain in Mexico City, Mexico

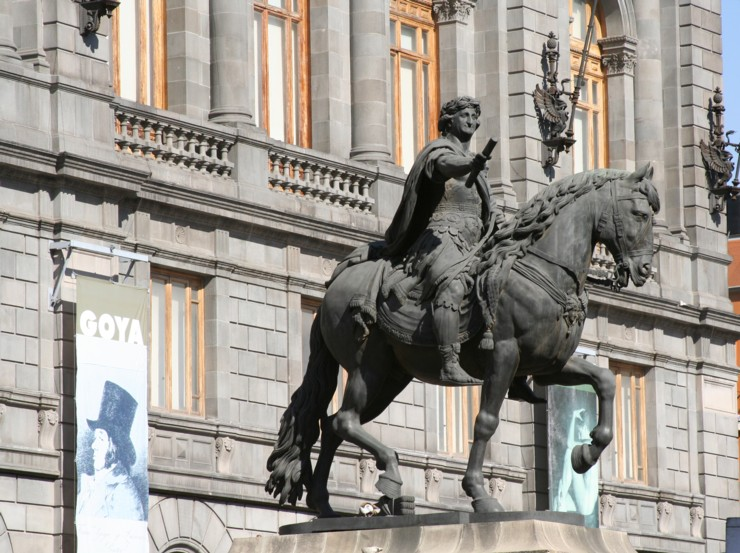
- The equestrian monument by Tolsá in Mexico City
- Artist: Manuel Tolsá
- Year: 1803
- Medium: Bronze
- Subject: Charles IV of Spain
- Location: Mexico City; 19.43605°N 99.13948°W

The equestrian statue of Charles IV of Spain (also known as El Caballito) is a bronze sculpture cast by Manuel Tolsá built between 1796 and 1803 in Mexico City, Mexico in honour of King Charles IV of Spain, then the last ruler of the New Spain (later Mexico). This statue has been displayed in different points of the city and is considered one of the finest achievements of Mr. Tolsá. It now resides in Plaza Manuel Tolsá.

== History ==
The project was initiated by Miguel de la Grúa Talamanca, Marquis of Branciforte, who was Viceroy of the New Spain. Once he obtained permission for the monument, he appointed people to perform the work and construction began. To that end, he emptied the main plaza (the Plaza de la Constitución, or “Zocalo”) and erected an elliptical railing with four access gates.

The pedestal for the statue was inaugurated with large and well-attended parties and bullfights on 8 December 1796. A temporary statue, constructed out of wood and gilded stucco, was placed on top of the pedestal; it also represented the Spanish monarch.

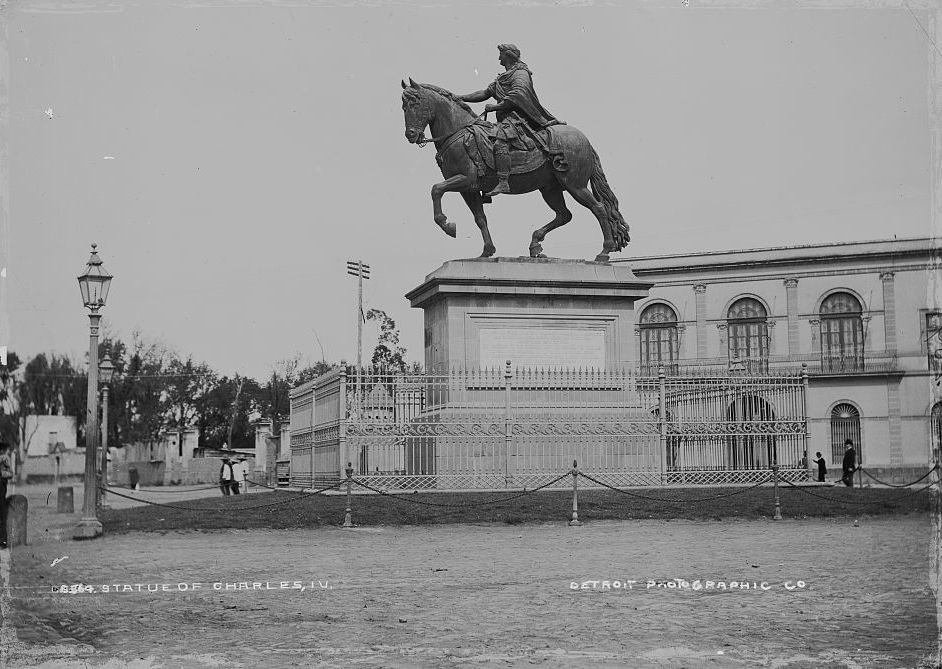
El Caballito, at Paseo de la Reforma and Avenida Bucareli protected by a grille, photo taken between 1880 and 1897

The Equestrian Statue of Charles IV was melted and cast in one operation under the supervision of Tolsá, who was director of the Academy of San Carlos. The statue required between 450 and 600 quintales of bronze (one quintal being equivalent to 46 kg), and was cast in the area near the Church of St. Peter and St. Paul. The sculptor modeled the frame after a horse owned by the Marquis of Jaral of Berrio named Tambor (or "drum"). After being polished and engraved, the statue was taken to its pedestal and inaugurated on 9 December 1803. The celebrations and bullfights were repeated, with great jubilation. The Baron Alexander von Humboldt was present at the unveiling. In his opinion, and for this genre, the statue produced by Tolsá is second only to the equestrian statue of Marcus Aurelius, in Rome.

In 1821, due to anti-Spanish sentiment manifesting during the Mexican independence, and due to a desire to replace the monument, the statue was covered in a blue tent. It was not long before people considered destroying the monument, to melt it down to reuse the bronze for guns or coins. Aggravating matters, underneath one of the hooves of the statue one will find the mark of an Aztec quiver, perhaps a sign of allegiance to Spain.

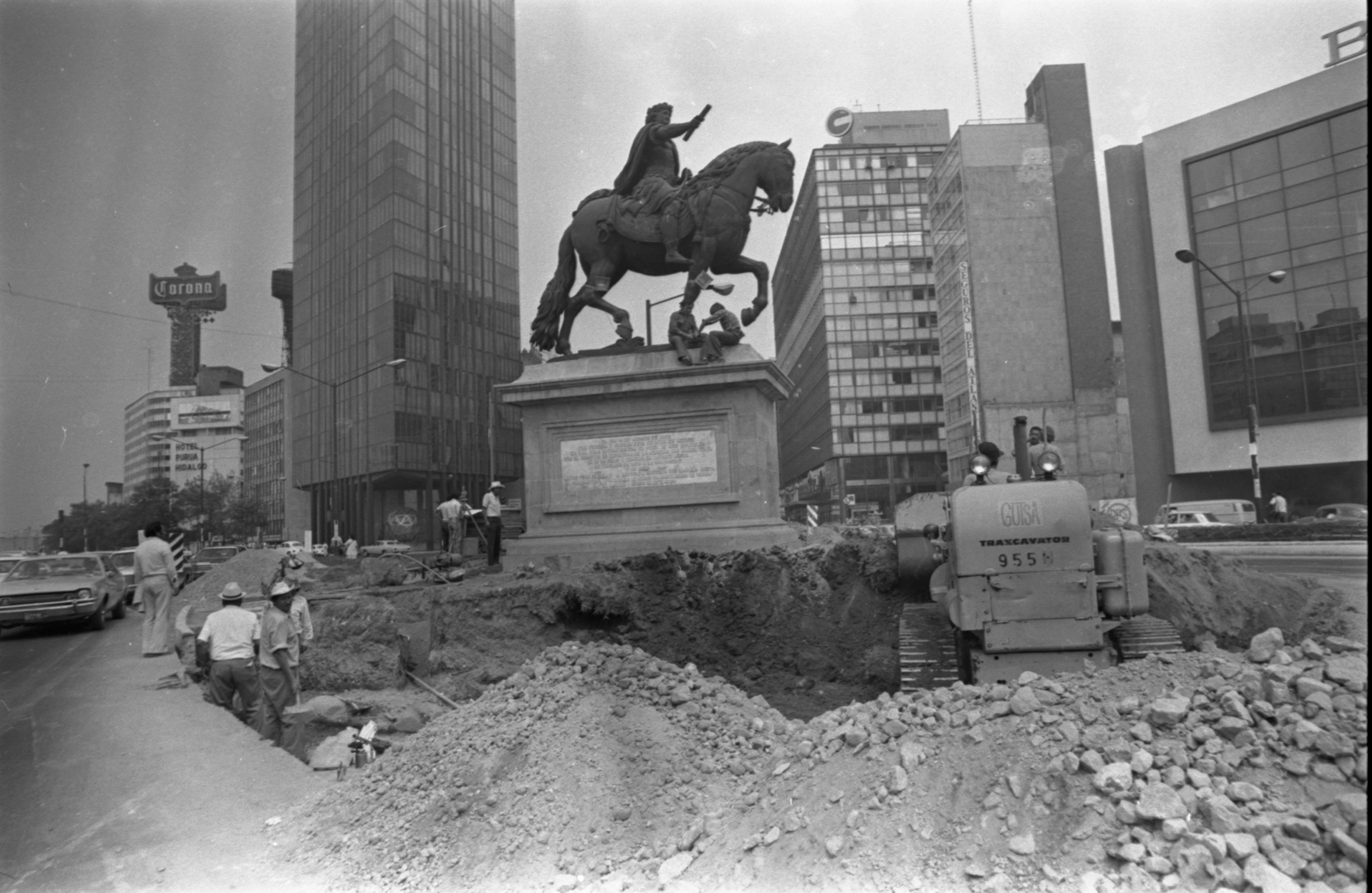
Works for the transfer of the statue, 1979

The statue was saved by Lucas Alamán, who convinced Guadalupe Victoria to retain the statue on the merit of its aesthetic qualities. This resulted in the statue being relocated in 1822 to the courtyard of the ancient university, to prevent people from destroying it. It wasn't until 1824 that the public was permitted to access the statue, but the statue was much safer in this location. In 1852, after years had passed and tempers had calmed, the statue was moved to the intersection Paseo de la Reforma and Avenida Bucareli, although this time it was protected from potential damage by a grille. In 1979 it was relocated to its current location, Plaza Manuel Tolsá, overlooking the Palacio de Minería. Currently, in response to the earlier controversy surrounding the statue, the plaque on the pedestal indicates that Mexico conserved the statue as a monument to art, and not as a sign of praise to a Spanish king. A smaller, slightly different version of the sculpture can be seen in the Tolsá museum opposite the statue.

The statue weighs 26 tonnes and is the second largest cast bronze statue in the world.

The place the statue occupied between 1852 and 1979, the corner of Paseo de la Reforma and Bucareli is now occupied by a statue called El caballito ("The Horse"), by sculptor Sebastián, erected in honour of the old monument.

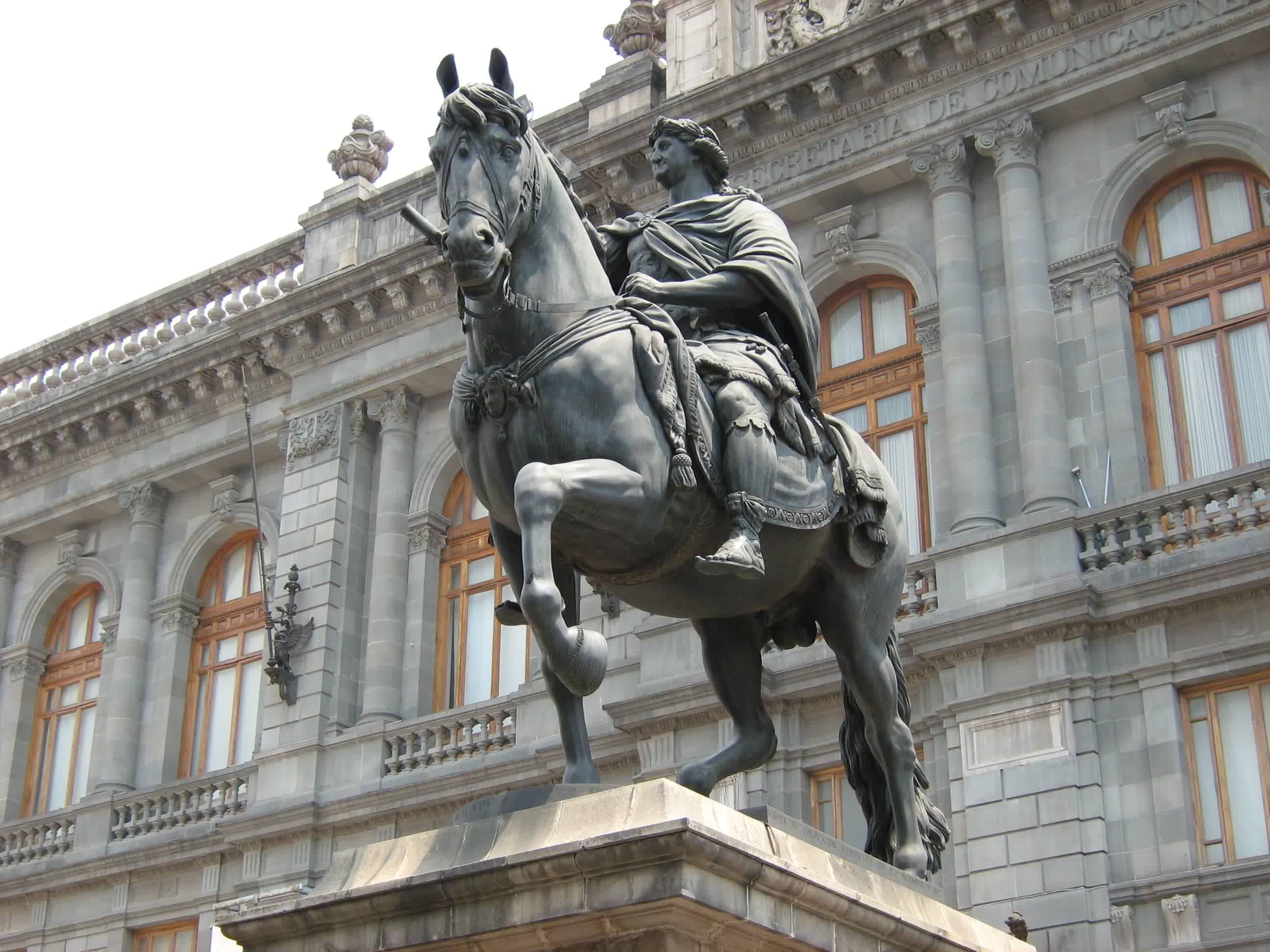
Equestrian statue of Charles IV

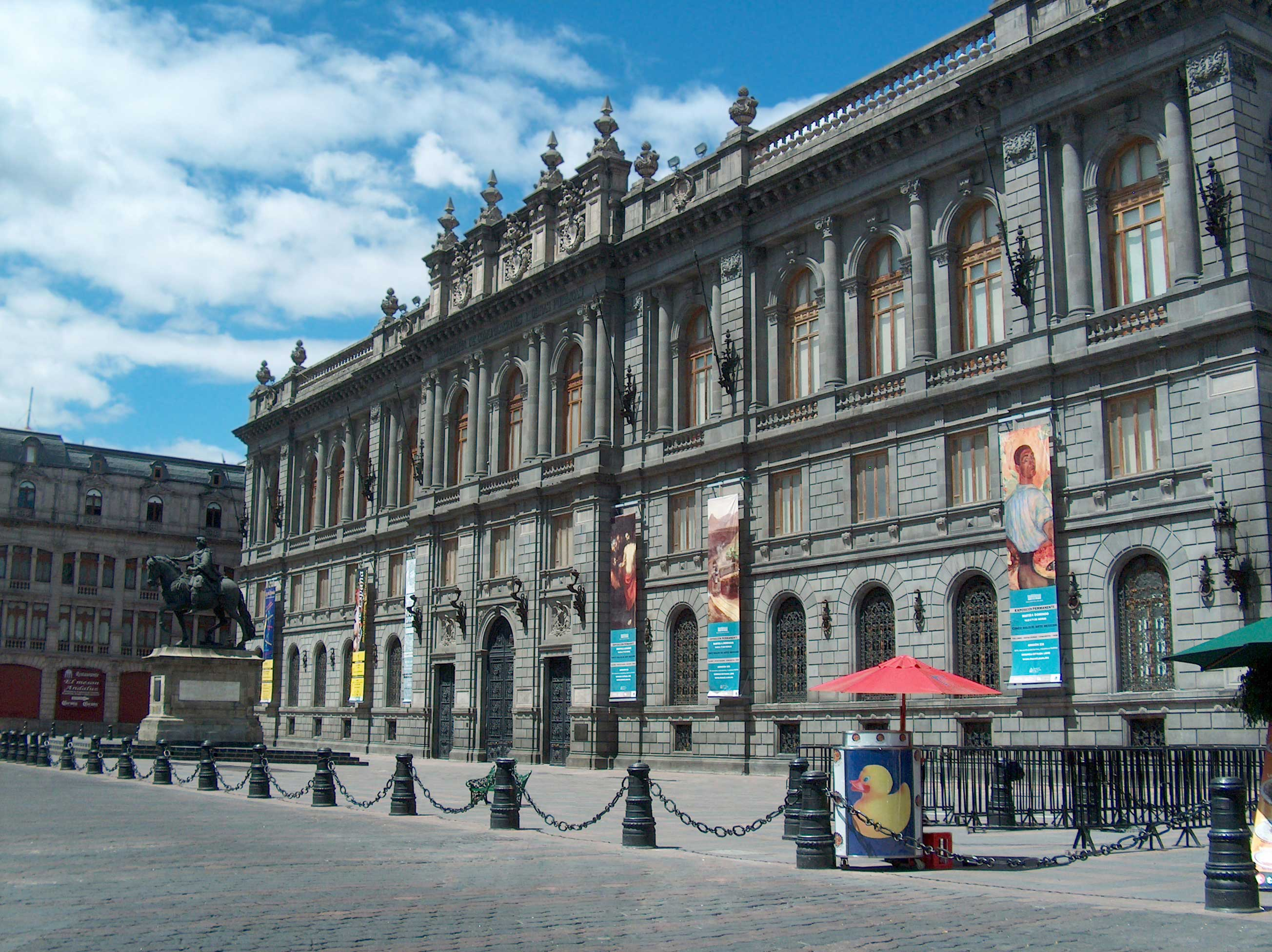
Museo Nacional de Arte MUNAL

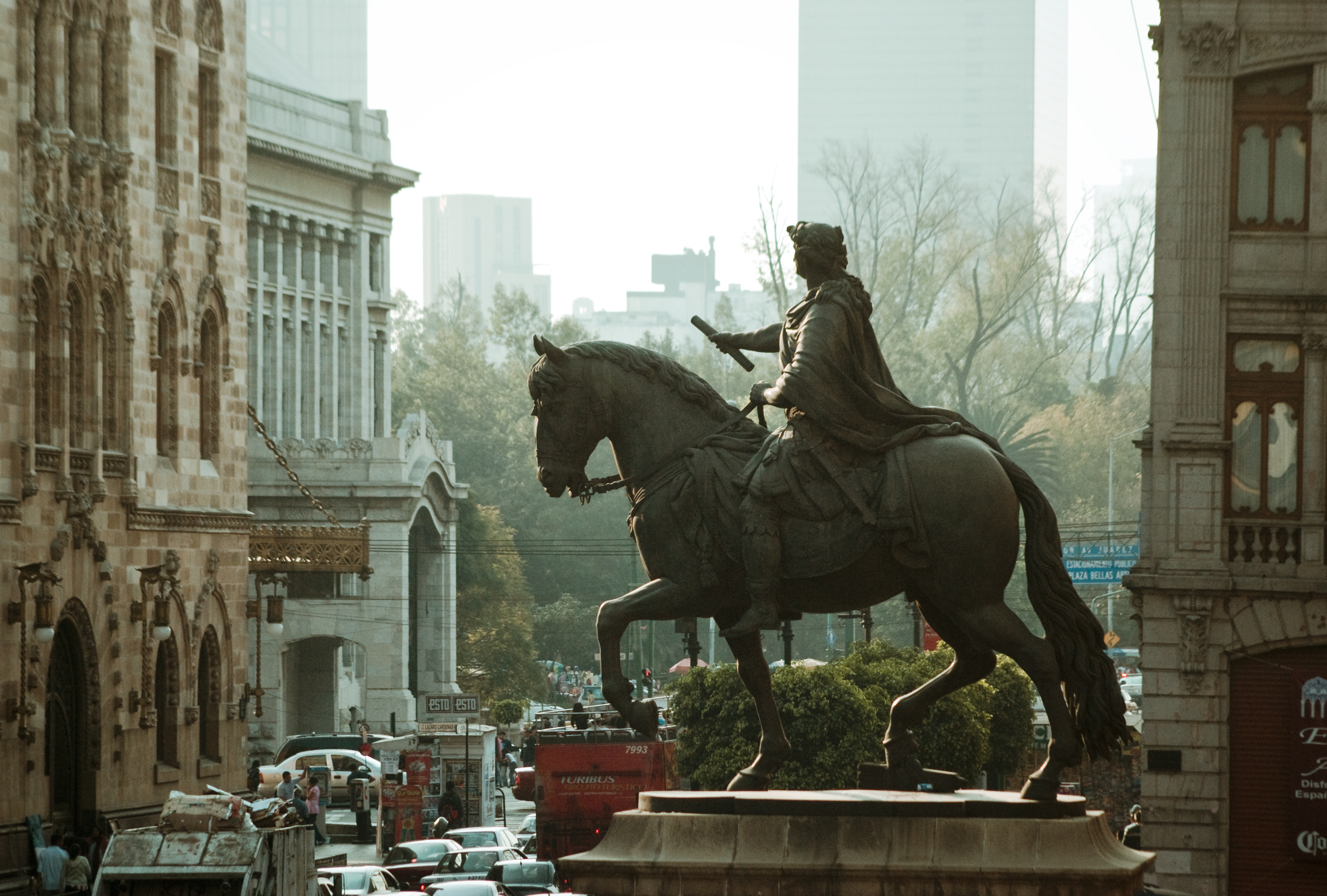
The equestrian monument seen from the side

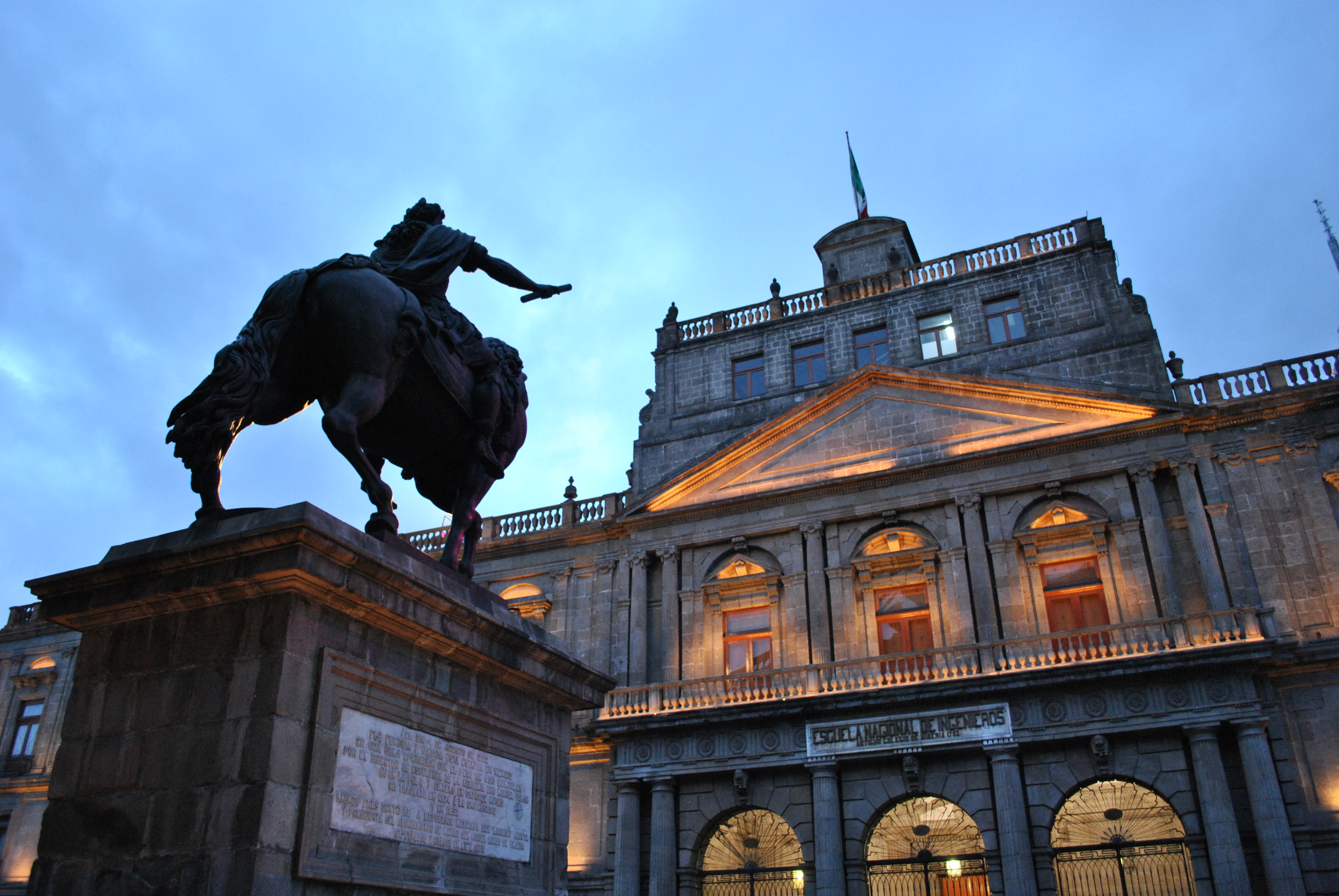
El caballito in the evening.

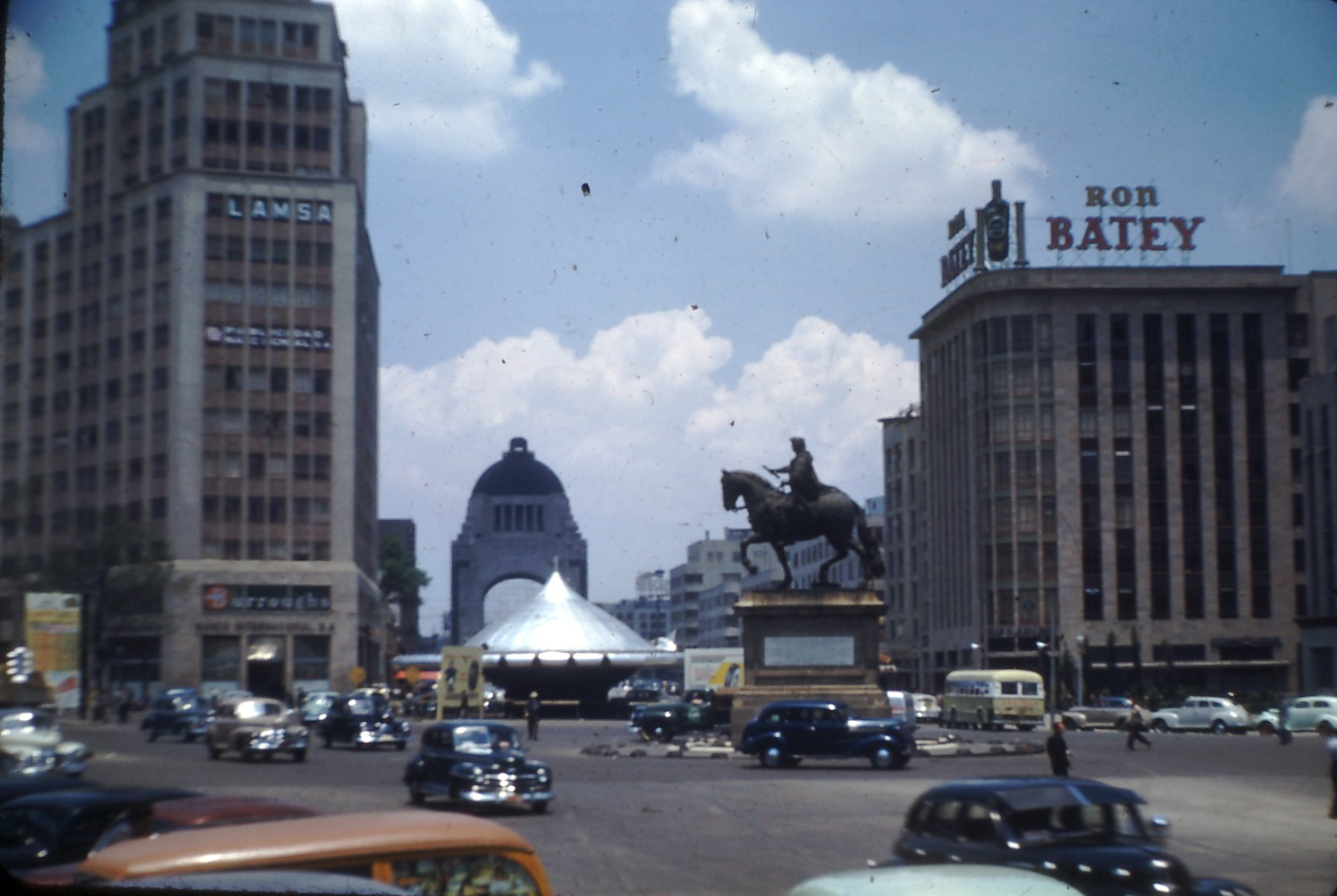
El Caballito and a "flying saucer" in 1948.

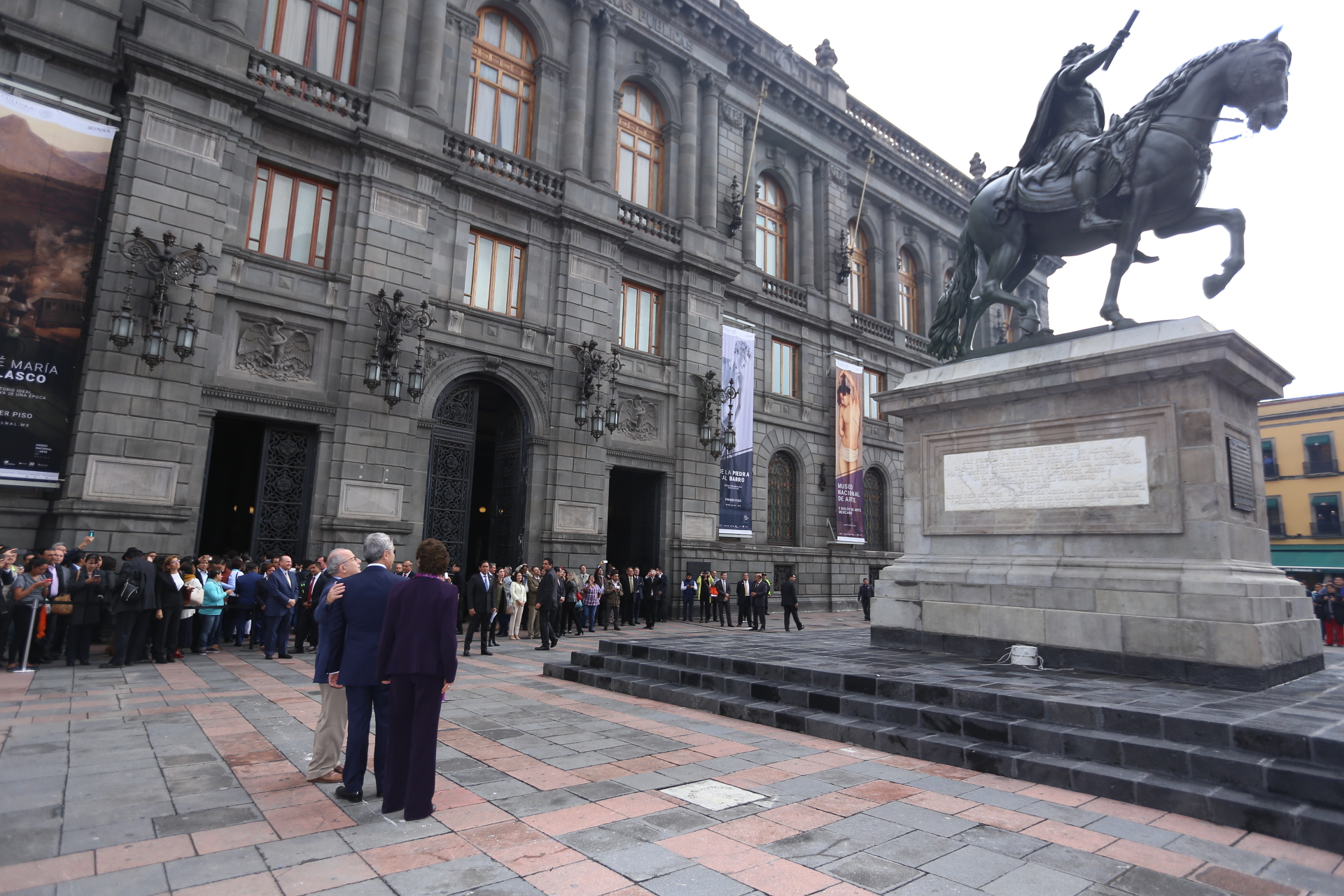
The 2017 equestrian statue of Charles IV of Spain restoration inauguration day

== See also ==
- Equestrian Statue of Marcus Aurelius
