= Avenida Bucareli =

Street in Mexico City, Mexico

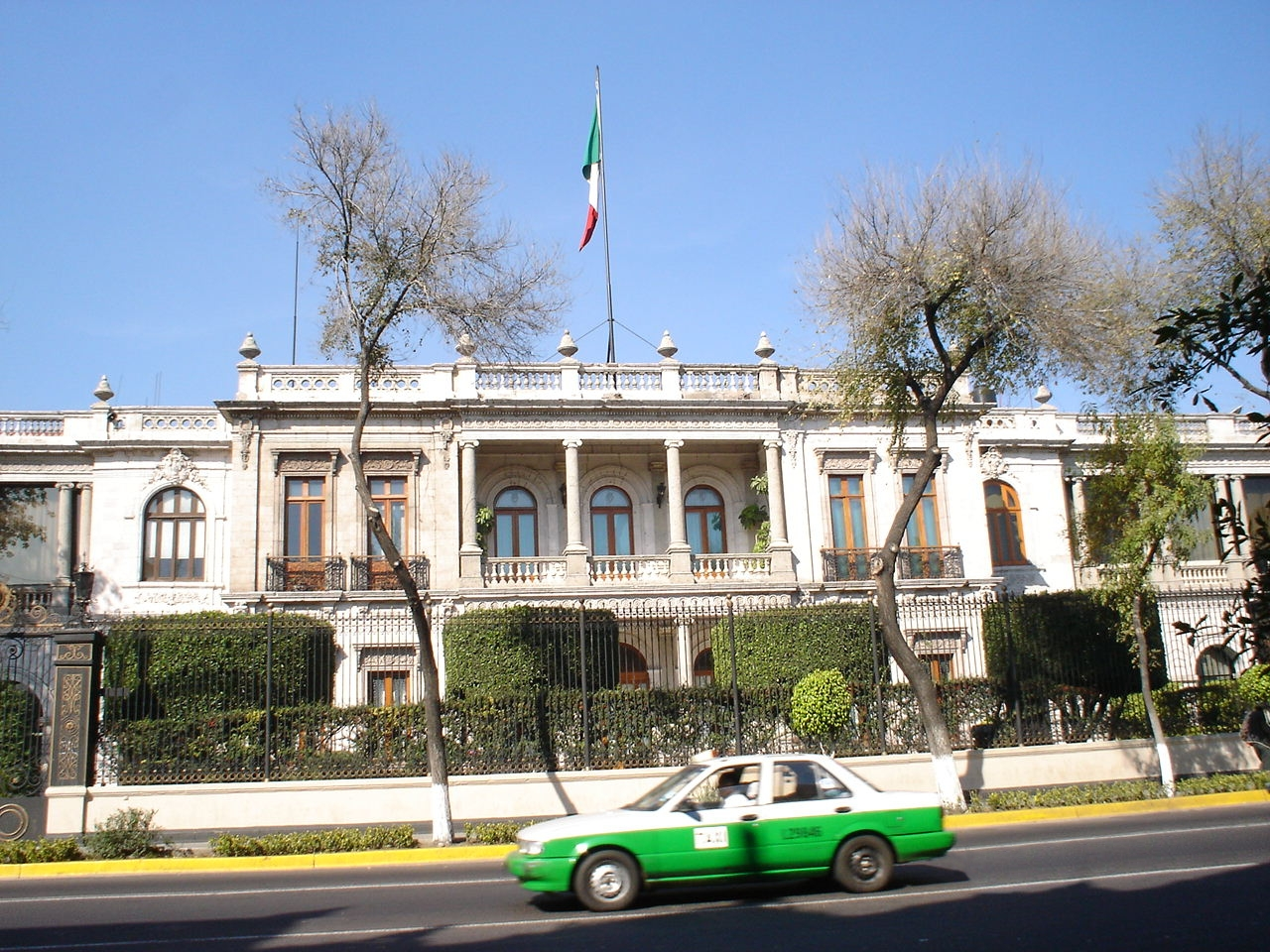
Secretariat of the Interior

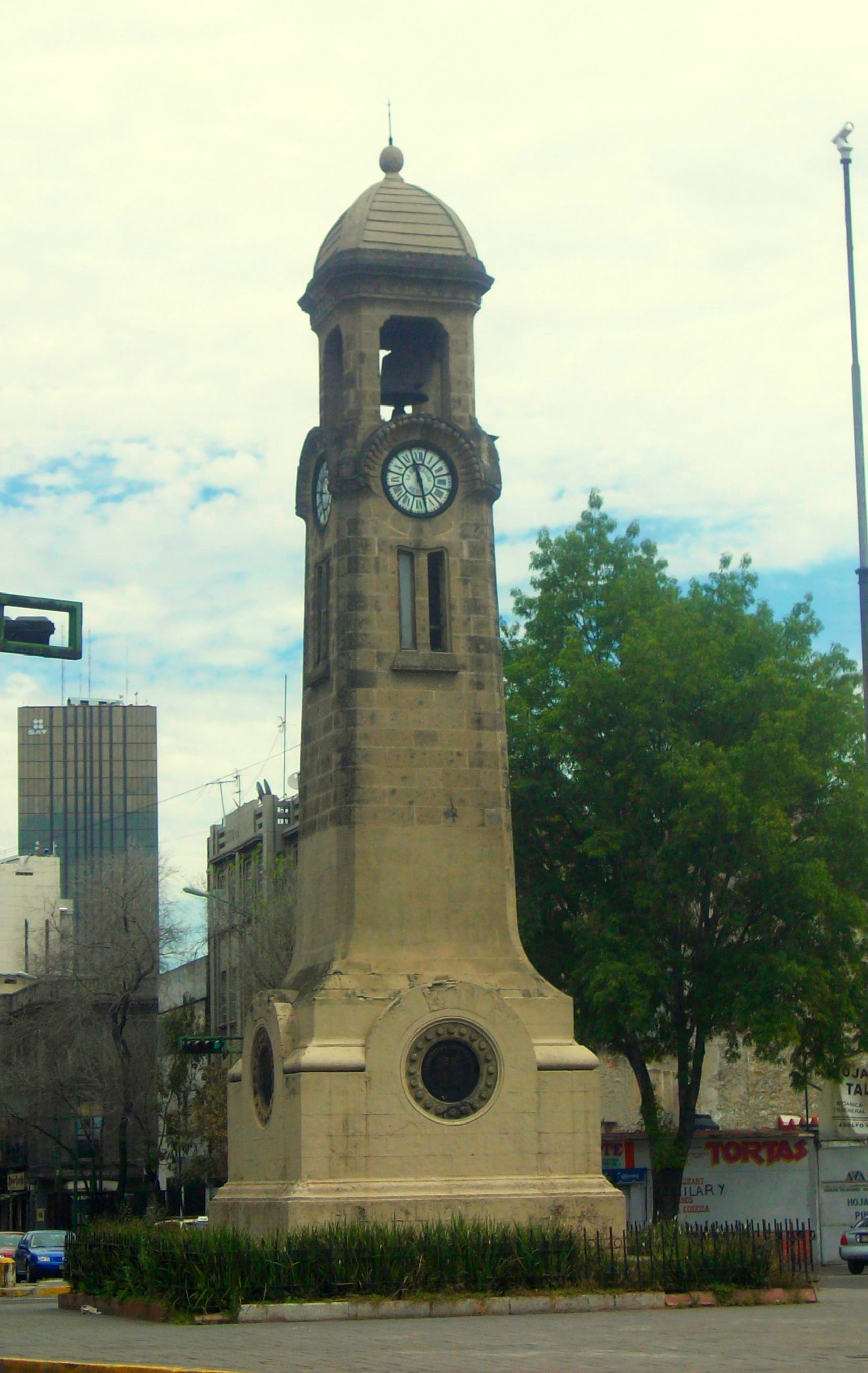
The Reloj Chino (Chinese clock)

Avenida Bucareli, often referred to as "Bucareli Street", is a main avenue and eje vial (arterial road) in Mexico City. It divides the historic center on the east from Colonia Juárez on the west. It is named after the viceroy of New Spain, Antonio María de Bucareli y Ursúa, who commissioned it. Built in the late 18th century and called Paseo Nuevo, it was once a wide boulevard lined with more than 1000 ash trees. In the 19th century the walking paths on either side were built upon and the avenue acquired its current width. It originally had three plazas, each with a fountain. Only one fountain survives, though it was moved to Plaza Loreto.

== Points of interest ==
- Paseo de la Reforma, Bucareli's northern end, the Glorieta del Caballito, where the Equestrian statue of Charles IV of Spain once stood
- Excélsior (1923) and El Universal newspaper buildings
- Café La Habana, opened in 1954
- Reloj Chino (Chinese clock)
- Edificio Gaona (1922)
- Secretariat of the Interior
- Edificio Vizcaya at #128
- Conjunto Mascota, workers' apartments along interior streets, developed by the founder of El Buen Tono cigarette company, and constructed by Miguel Ángel de Quevedo.
- Mercado Juárez, the local market for Colonia Juárez
- Avenida Chapultepec, southern end of Bucareli
