= Xóchitl =

Xóchitl (Mexican Spanish pronunciation: [ˈʃotʃitɬ]) is the Westernised version of "xōchitl", the Nahuatl word for flower (Nahuatl pronunciation: [ˈʃoːtʃitɬ]). It is a unisex given name that is somewhat common in Mexico and Chicanos. The name has been a common Nahuatl name among Nahuas for hundreds of years. It was recorded on an early-16th century census of the Aztec people in the villages of Huitzillan and Quauchichinollan, where it was found to be the tenth most common name among boys. In a 1590 census, the boys name Xōchipepe (flower gatherer) was recorded, as well as the girls' names of Ēlōxōchitl (magnolia), Miyāoaxōchitl (maize tassel flower), and Xīlōxōch (calliandra), which all draw from Xochitl.

== People ==
- Xochitl (d. 916), Toltec queen and wife of Tecpancaltzin Iztaccaltzin
- Xochitl Castañeda, founding director of the Health Initiative of the Americas
- Xochitl Dominguez Benetton (born 1980), Mexican scientist
- Xóchitl Escobedo (born 1968), retired female tennis player from Mexico
- Xóchitl Gálvez (born 1963), Mexican politician and businesswoman
- Xochitl Gomez (born 2006), American actress
- Xochitl Gonzalez (born 1977), American writer and producer
- Xóchitl Hamada (born 1970), semi-retired Mexican-Japanese professional wrestler
- Xóchitl Montes de Oca (born 1971), Mexican politician
- Xóchitl Sánchez (born 1973), Mexican luchadora known by the ring name Tiffany
- Xochitl Torres Small (born 1984), American water attorney who represented New Mexico's 2nd congressional district
- Xóchitl Ugarte (born 1979), Mexican voice actress

== See also ==
- Xochitla ("place of flowers"), park in Tepotzotlán, State of Mexico, Greater Mexico City
