= CMHI =

CMHI may refer to:

- China Merchants Holdings (International), a large logistics corporation based in Hong Kong
- California-Mexico Health Initiative (now Health Initiative of the Americas), a Latin American health organization based in California
- Children's Memorial Health Institute in Warsaw, Poland
