= Chicano names =

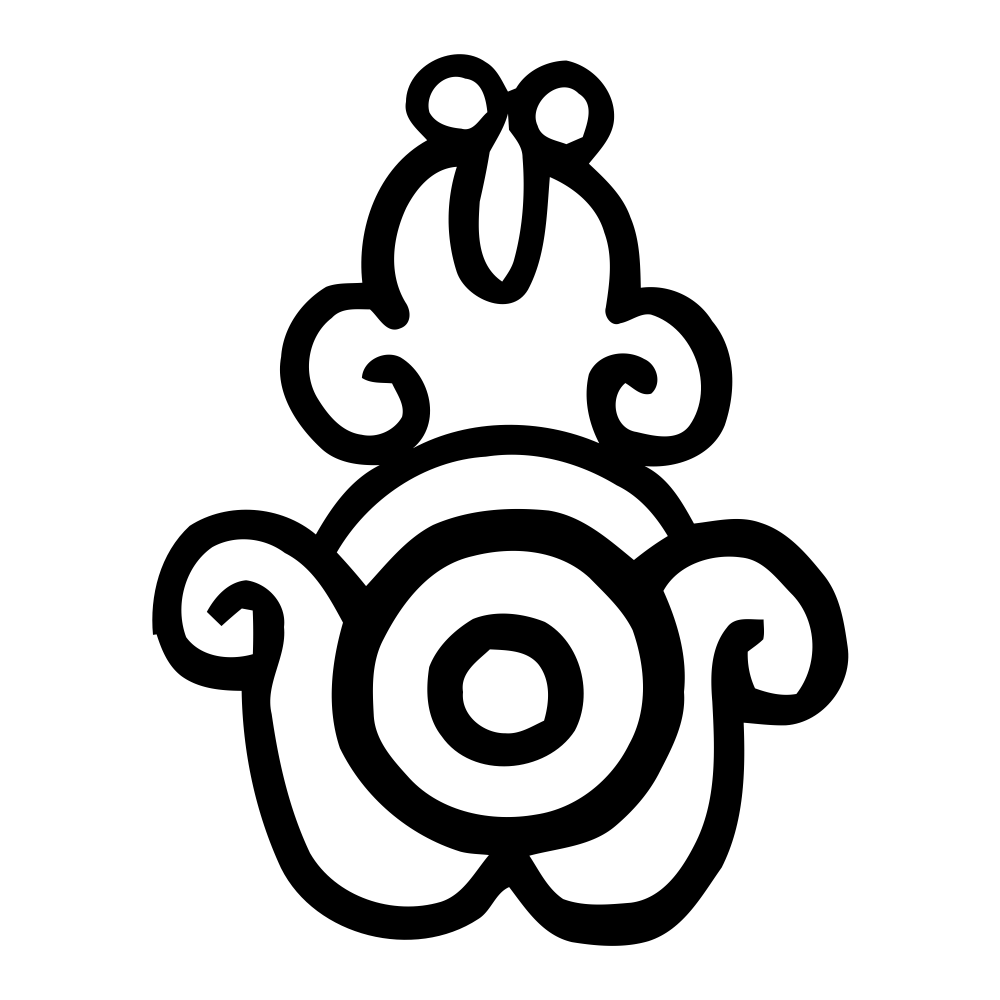
Nahuatl symbol for xōchitl, a flower. Xochitl is one of the most common names adopted by Chicanos after the Chicano Movement.

Chicano naming practices formed out of the cultural pride that was established in the Chicano Movement. This motivated some Chicanos to adopt Indigenous Mexican names, often Aztec (or Nahuatl) in origin, for themselves and their children, rather than Spaniard names, which were first imposed onto Indigenous Mexico in the 16th century through the Spanish colonization of the Americas. The other significant development in naming that emerged from the Chicano Movement was to inspire Chicanos not to anglicize their names, maintaining Spanish spellings and pronunciations.

== Background ==
Prior to the Spanish colonization of Mexico, Indigenous peoples had their own naming conventions and names. This was significantly altered in the 16th century, with the arrival of Spaniards and the shift in balance to Spanish power in the region.

Catholic baptisms and conversion ceremonies often accompanied the practice of Christian missionaries changing Indigenous people's names to Hispanic, and especially Christian names, such as Jose, Maria, Gonzalo, Francisco, Antonio, Jesus, Ana, and Magdalena. According to Julian Segura Camacho, this was an attempt to destroy their culture and identity.

Despite this public performance, many Indigenous people's often resisted Hispanicization and maintained their traditions, even if only in their own cuallis (or homes). This led to the survival of Indigenous names over hundreds of years.

== Adopting Nahuatl names ==
As a result of the Chicano Movement, Chicanos who had pride in their Indigenous Mexican roots sometimes adopted or named their children Nahuatl names. Although Chicanos may have roots from many different Indigenous peoples of Mexico, adoption of Nahuatl names is most common to create pride in one's heritage.

Name adoption often accompanies at least a beginner's knowledge of the Nahuatl language. The name may reflect one's birth relationship to the Aztec calendar, being granted a name from an elder, or carefully selecting a name that reflects one's personality. Some common names include:

- Cuahtémoc or Cuautemoc, the last Aztec tlatoani of Tenochitlan
- Citlalli, star
- Mixtli, cloud
- Moctezuma, Aztec tlatoani of Tenochitlan
- Pactli, pleasure or joy
- Tizoc, seventh tlatoani of Tenochitlan
- Topiltzin, implying divinity, associated with Quetzalcoatl
- Xochitl, flower or Toltec queen
- Xol, pronounced "shoal"

== Resisting anglicization ==
Prior to the Chicano Movement, the anglicization of Spaniard names among Mexican Americans was the norm. This was both imposed onto Mexican American children from Anglo institutions, most often schools, or from their parents who often believed anglicization of their names would bring their child less prejudice or anti-Mexican sentiment. The Chicano Movement inspired Chicanos to keep Spanish spellings and pronunciations, even as anglicization still continued among others.

=== Examples of anglicization ===
- The name Jesús is changed to Jesse
- The name Miguel is changed to Michael
