= Marc B. Schenker =

Researcher at University of California, Davis

- Education: University of California, San Francisco; Harvard School of Public Health
- Known for: Public Health Research
- Awards: Fulbright Senior Scientist Foreign Scholarship Award, France (1993); George C. Griffith Scholarship, American College of Physicians (1982); UC Davis Distinguished Wellness Lecturer (1995)
- Scientific career
- Fields: Epidemiology, Occupational Health, Medicine
- Workplaces: University of California, Davis

Marc B. Schenker is a professor of Public Health Sciences and Medicine at the University of California, Davis and the director of the Migration and Health Research Center (MAHRC).

== See also ==
- Migration and Health Research Center
- Health Initiative of the Americas
