= Migration and Health Research Center =

Research institute in California

The Migration and Health Research Center (MAHRC) is a collaborative effort between the University of California, Berkeley, and the University of California, Davis that promotes research and knowledge of migrant health issues.

== History ==
MAHRC is a collaboration between two programs of the University of California: Representing University of California, Berkeley is the Health Initiative of the Americas (HIA), one of California most influential migrant health organizations. Representing the University of California, Davis is the Center for Occupational and Environmental Health (COEH). MAHRC's founding will be commemorated by a signing of a Memorandum of Agreement on September 9, 2009, in Sacramento, California.

== Leadership ==
Serving as director of MAHRC will be COEH Director Marc Schenker, MD. Schenker has been a professor in the field of public health for more than 25 years, and has published numerous studies and articles on health issues.

HIA Director Xochitl Castaneda will serve as MAHRC's associate director. As the director of HIA, Castaneda has been at the forefront of migrant health issues for nearly a decade, and has been actively involved in researching migrant health concerns.

== Objective ==
MAHRC conducts and promotes collaborative research and long-term linkages among U.S. universities, Latin American and international research institutions, and local, state, and federal government entities. The research efforts seek to understand the causes of illness and injuries among migrants/immigrants, thus providing a basis for developing strategies and policies to reduce the onset of diseases and increase and improve health care delivery for affected populations. Dissemination of scientific results is targeted to academic, government, NGO and public audiences.

Its primary aim will be to sponsor and encourage research health concerns of migrants all across the United States. It will also attempt to create partnerships with many Latin countries that have considerable immigration flows to the United States, such as HIA partner countries Mexico, El Salvador, Peru and Colombia. MAHRC will also attempt to collaborate with renowned health organizations such as the Centers for Disease Control and Prevention and the National Institute of Health.

== See also ==
- Health Initiative of the Americas
- Xochitl Castaneda
- Marc Schenker
