= Gas-diffusion electrocrystallization =

Gas-diffusion electrocrystallization (GDEx) is an electrochemical process consisting on the reactive precipitation of metal ions in solution (or dispersion) with intermediaries produced by the electrochemical reduction of gases (such as oxygen), at gas diffusion electrodes. It can serve for the recovery of metals or metalloids into solid precipitates or for the synthesis of libraries of nanoparticles.

== History ==
The gas-diffusion electrocrystallization process was invented in 2014 by Xochitl Dominguez Benetton at the Flemish Institute for Technological Research, in Belgium. The patent for the process granted in Europe was filed in 2015 and its expiration is anticipated in 2036.

== Process ==
Gas-diffusion electrocrystallization is a process electrochemically driven at porous gas-diffusion electrodes, in which a triple phase boundary is established between a liquid solution, an oxidizing gas, and an electrically conducting electrode. The liquid solution containing dissolved metal ions (e.g., CuCl_{2}, ZnCl_{2}) flows through an electrochemical cell equipped with a gas diffusion electrode, making contact with its electrically conducting part (typically a porous layer). The oxidizing gas (e.g., pure O_{2}, O_{2} in air, CO_{2}, etc.) percolates through a hydrophobic layer on the gas diffusion electrode, acting as a cathode. After the gas diffuses to the electrically conducting layer acting as an electrocatalyst (e.g., hydrophilic activated carbon), the gas is electrochemically reduced. For instance, by imposing specific cathodic polarization conditions (e.g., −0.145 VSHE O_{2} is reduced, to H_{2}O_{2} in a 2 electron (2 e^{–}) transfer process and H_{2}O in a 4 electron (4 e^{–}) transfer process. OH^{–} are also produced in the process. As this happens, abrupt local pH and local electrolyte redox potential changes arise within the cathode porosity. As the hydroxyl ions spread to the bulk electrolyte, systematic pH increases become consistently manifest in the electrolyte bulk. In due course, low amounts of H_{2}O_{2} are generated. In steady state, a reaction front is fully developed throughout the hydrodynamic boundary layer. This creates local saturation conditions at the electrochemical interface, where metal ions precipitate in metastable or stable phases depending on the operational variables. When oxygen is the oxidizing gas, the mechanism for gas-diffusion electrocrystallization has been explained as an oxidation-assisted alkaline precipitation using gas-diffusion electrodes.

== Honors ==
In 2020, the gas-diffusion electrocrystallization process was presented as a great EU-funded innovation by the Innovation Radar of the European Commission, for its application on the secondary recovery of platinum group metals.
