= Museo Nacional del Virreinato =

Mexican museum devoted to New Spain

Coordinates: 19°42′46.51″N 99°13′19.57″W

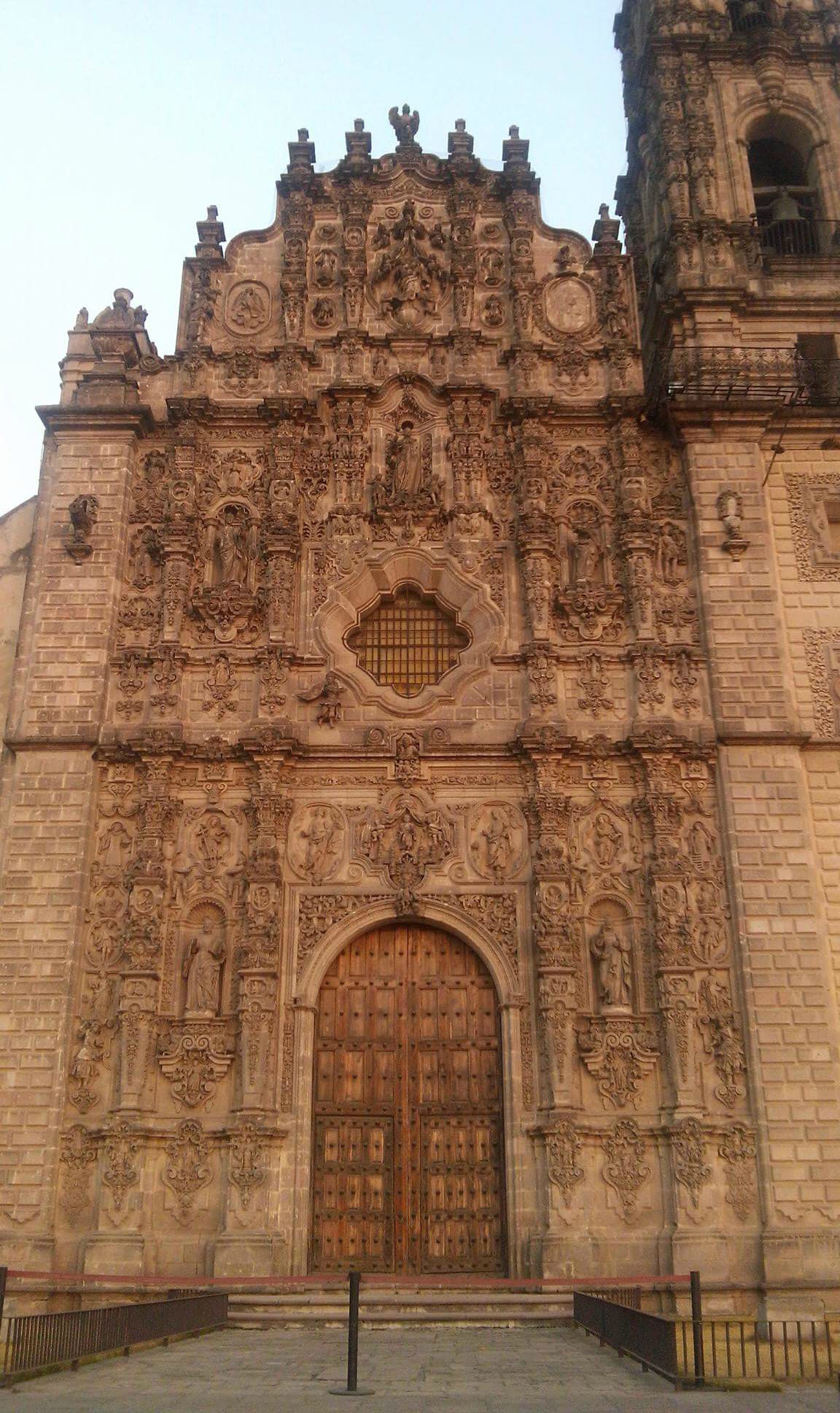
Facade of the main door to the museum in February 2018

The Museo Nacional del Virreinato (in Spanish, National Museum of the Viceroyalty of New Spain) is located in the former College of San Francisco Javier in Tepotzotlán, Mexico State, Mexico. It belongs to Consejo Nacional para la Cultura y las Artes. The complex was built by the Aztecs, and used by the Jesuits starting in the 1580s. Three centers of learning were founded in the complex: a school to teach indigenous languages to Jesuit evangelists, a school for native boys, and the College of San Francisco Javier, to train Jesuit priests. The complex comprises three sections: the college area, with dormitories, a library, a kitchen, and a domestic chapel; the Church of San Francisco Javier; and the Church of San Pedro Apostol. The former college and the Church of San Francisco Javier have been converted into the Museo del Virreinato, with the former college area housing a large collection of art and ordinary objects from the colonial era, and the Church of San Francisco Javier housing one of the most important collections of Churrigueresque altarpieces in Mexico. The Church of San Pedro Apostol is the only part of the entire complex that is still used for religious purposes.

== The College of San Francisco Javier ==
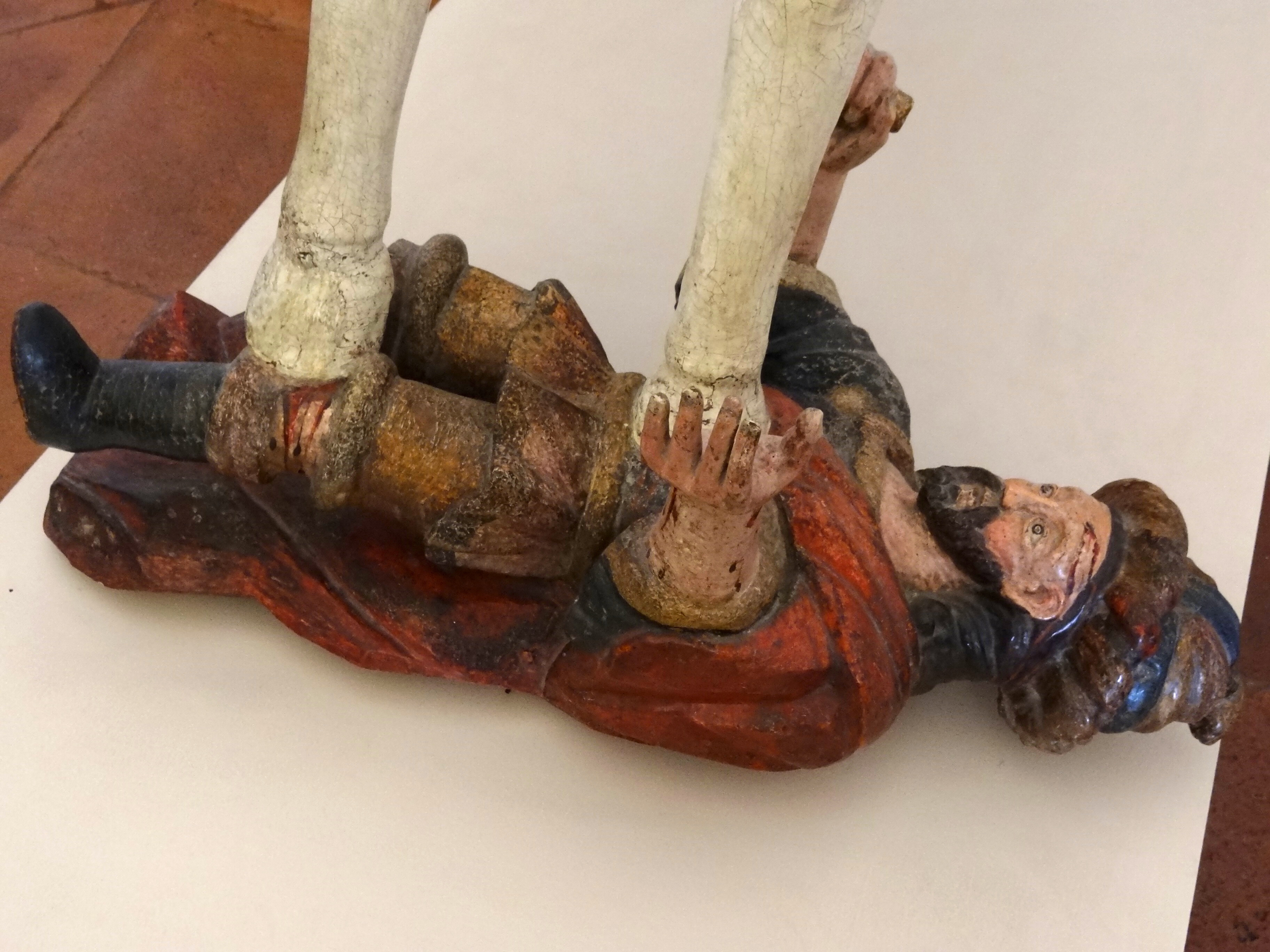
A figure of a Moor being trampled by a conquistador's horse at the museum.

The Jesuits arrived in Mexico in 1572, too late for the evangelization of most of the populace of central Mexico, most of which had already been done by other orders such as the Franciscans, Dominicans, and Augustinians by the 1580s. However, the Jesuits did find a need in education. The Jesuits arrived to Tepotzotlán in the 1580s and took up residence in local structures. A local Indian leader, Martín Maldonado, became impressed with the Jesuits, who had already started a school to teach indigenous languages to priests. Maldonado made a large donation to the Jesuits in order begin a school for Indian boys. This school was named San Martín and the boys were taught religion, reading and writing in Spanish and music. In the mid-1580s, the training of Jesuit priests was moved from the San Pedro y San Pablo College in Mexico City to a new facility called the College of San Francisco Javier. These schools would make Tepotzotlán one of the most prestigious educational centers in New Spain.

The school complex continued to grow during the 17th century, and the adjoining Church of San Francisco Javier was begun in 1670. The school continued to increase in prestige and size until 1767, when the Jesuits were expelled from all Spanish-held territory, and the Spanish Crown took possession of all Jesuit-held properties.

The college was abandoned for eight years until Archbishop Alonso Nuñez de Haro y Peralta put it under the care of ordinary priests and renamed it the Real Colegio de Instrucción Retiro Voluntario y Corrección del Clero Secular. This institution not only trained new priests, it served as a retirement community for elderly or disabled priests. It also served as a place to send priests who had "committed some kind of error."

The Jesuits returned to former Spanish territories in the mid 19th century but there were not enough of them to take over the institution in Mexico even though it was offered. In 1859, the Reform Laws declared the complex as property of the nation although the Church of San Francisco Javier still kept offering Mass. Because of the poor conditions at penitentiaries at this time, it was decided to use former monasteries and convents for this purpose. However, in spite of the fact that the complex was turned over to the State of Mexico in 1871, the local populace would not permit it to be used as a jail. Later, such would be considered again by Porfirio Díaz, but it never came to pass.

During the Mexican Revolution, the school was still functioning with Father Gonzalo Carrasco as the dean. General Coss ordered the expulsion of the priest and his company as it was rumored that they were trying to reform a monastic order. Knowing that Carrasco was a painter, Coss ordered him to paint a portrait of Venustiano Carranza and renounce his collar. Carrasco refused and was sent to the prison in Teoloyucan, and the students were sent to Mexico City. Soldiers then occupied the complex, sacking it.

The college was abandoned by the Jesuits for good in 1914 and the church was opened to the public. Rumors persisted that great treasures were buried on the complex grounds, forcing the complex to allow searches in 1928, 1931, 1932 and 1934, which caused damage to the main church. The complex was declared a national monument in 1933. The complex is one of the few in Mexico that has been preserved completely intact, including its altarpieces and artworks.

In 1961, restoration work was begun on the church and college complex by then president Adolfo López Mateos and in 1964 it was inaugurated. Most of the museum's collection came from the old Museum of Religious Art which was part of the Mexico City Cathedral. The precious metal objects were donated by the National Museum of History and a pre-Hispanic blanket was donated by the Museo Nacional de Antropología. Other objects in the collection were donated by private parties.

== The Museum ==
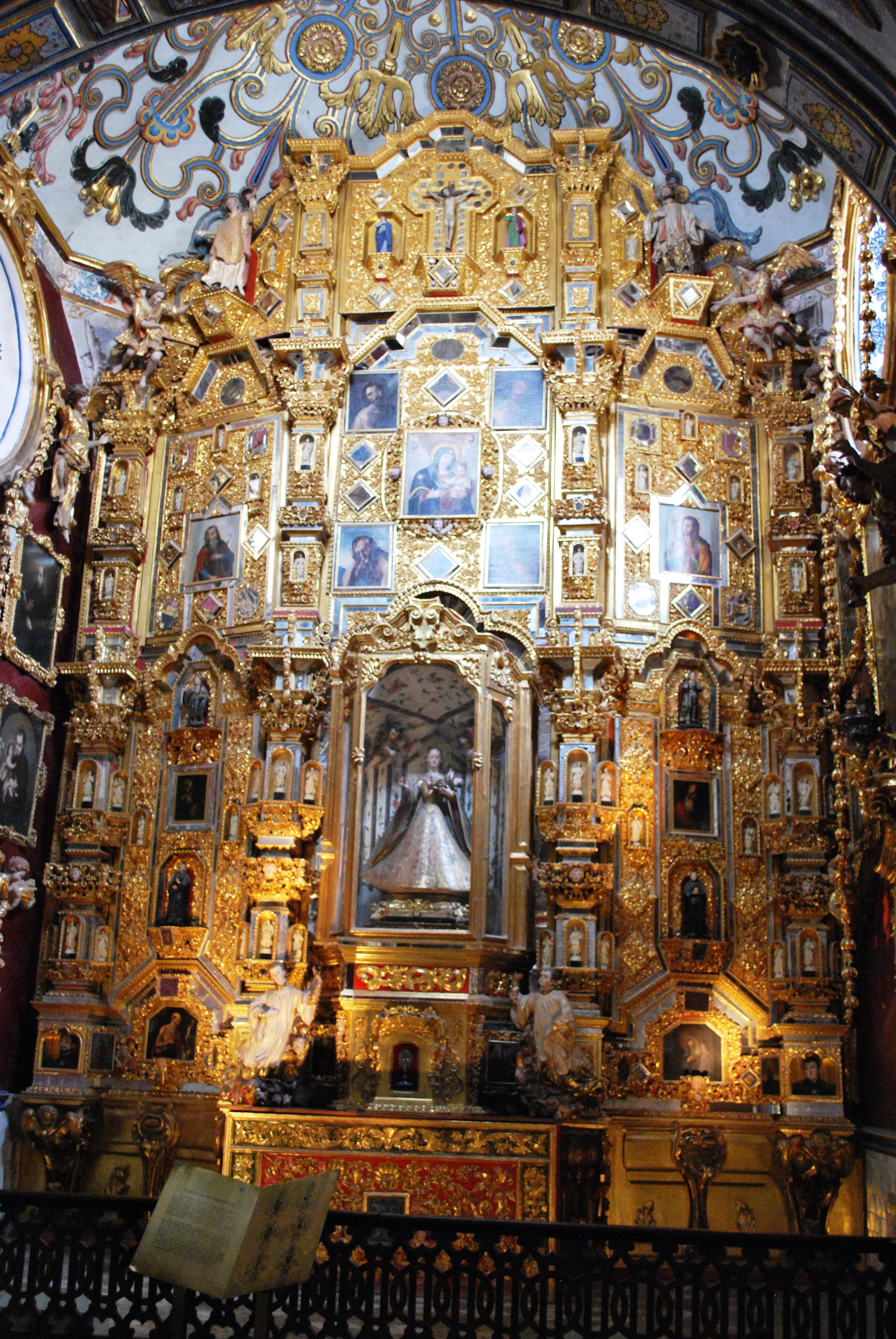
Main altar of the college's domestic chapel

Most of the complex is taken up by the Museo del Virreinato situated in what used to be the College of San Francisco Javier. The Museo is considered to be one of the most impressive in the country due both to its collection and to the aesthetics of the building that houses it. Remodeling of the college began in 1961 and finished three years later under the direction of then-president Adolfo López Mateos. It was inaugurated with much the same look and permanent collection that it has today. The complex contains a number of interior courtyards, such as the Aljibes and the Naranjo, as well as a domestic chapel, library, dormitories, refectory, and kitchen. A wide arched passageway in the back of the complex leads to the extensive gardens area of more than 3 hectares, filled with gardens, sculptures and the original Salta de Agua fountain, which marked the end of the old Chapultepec aqueduct. Much of its collection is made of liturgical pieces from the old Museum of Religious Art which was part of the Mexico City Cathedral. These are distributed among the many rooms of the college complex. There are pieces done in ivory, wood and a paste made from corn stalks among other materials. Religious vestments that were in the Religious Art museum include chasubles, dalmatic stoles, capes and bags for corporals and maniples. Work in precious metals, especially silver, include a wide variety of monstrance and tabernacles, chalices, reliquaries, naviculas, crosses, censers, candlesticks, and ciboria.

It now houses important artworks and other objects relating to the colonial period of Mexico. It contains twenty paintings by Cristóbal de Villalpando, as well as creations by Juan Correa, Maerten de Vos, Miguel Cabrera, the Rodríguez Juárez brothers and José de Ibarra. The collection is one of the largest from the Mexican colonial era. These paintings exhibit a variety of techniques and are almost all of religious themes. Sculptures include works done in "estofado" and "encarnado," two techniques that were popular at the time. There are also realistic pieces with hair, glass eyes and real teeth.

There are exhibits of non-religious everyday items from the colonial period such as silverware and other objects of precious metals, textiles and tools. Among the ceramics on display are pieces created in the Majolica and Talavera styles, in addition to Asian pieces brought via the Manila galleon. The museum's collection of furniture traces the evolution of styles during this period and includes tables, chairs, stools, lecterns, and desks with metal and mother-of-pearl inlay. Numerous tools, arms and other horsemanship items are found here such as irons, harnesses, swords, guns, locks, stirrups, spurs, trunks, chests, helmets, and complete suits-of-armor. There is a collection of lacquered and inlaid objects from Michoacán and Chiapas which date from the 17th century. The museum has fine example of rare feather art, as well as interesting glass objects, mostly from Spain, France, England and Germany. The book collection of about 4,000 volumes is concentrated in the old college library. The volumes date from the 16th to the 19th centuries, written in various languages with different types of binding.

Museum services include guided tours, a library specializing in colonial history and a book store. The Hostería del Convento is a lodging and restaurant facility located within the complex. Every year, this hostel sponsors "posadas," which are a type of pre-Christmas pageant, as well as nativity plays. This tradition was revived in 1963 and fills the air with songs and fireworks. These events are accompanied by piñatas and "ponche" a hot, spiced fruit drink.

== Church of San Francisco Javier ==
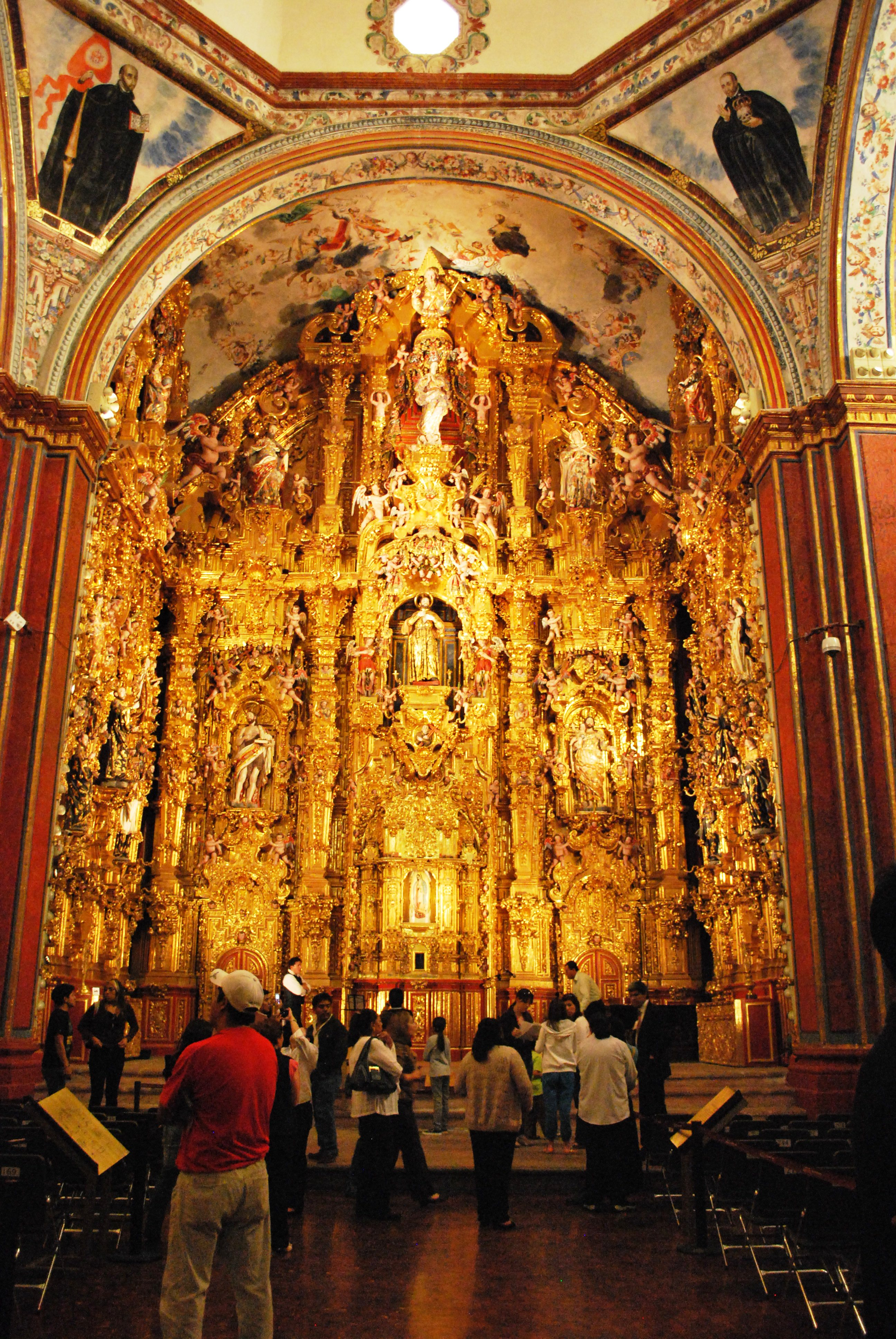
Main altar of the Church of San Francisco Javier, part of the Museum complex

The layout of the church is of typical Latin cross design with a cupola with a pendentive. The groin vaults of the church preserve decorative motifs. In the pendentive is a mural from the 17th century which is identified as Saint Aloysius Gonzaga with tiger lilies as a symbol of purity, Saint Stanislaus Kostka with the infant Jesus in his arms, Francis of Borgia with a skull, and Ignatius of Loyola with the Jesuit standard. In the 18th century, these paintings were covered by oils of the Four Evangelists. They were moved to the ante-choir in the 1960s.

The facade of the church of San Francisco Javier was constructed between 1760 and 1762 of grey stone and covered the original facade from the 17th century. This facade is attributed to architect Ildefonso Iniesta Bejarano. The facade summarizes the themes that are presented in the altarpieces inside. The most prominent image is of the Virgin Mary as the Great Patroness of the Jesuits. At the crest is an image of the Archangel Michael. The ornamentation of its facade continues up through the bell tower which dates from the 18th century and the use of the "estipite" (inverted truncated pyramid) column here is very evident as the decoration of the facade continues up the tower. The tower is topped by an iron cross. This facade is considered to be the most important of the Churriguerisque style in Mexico.

The large atrium in front of the museum complex is called the Plaza de la Cruz, which contains an atrium cross made of stone and carved with scenes from the Passion of Christ.

The Church of San Francisco Javier is no longer used for religious services and is now part of the museum. This church contains one of the most important collections of Churrigueresque altarpieces in Mexico. These feature the Baroque estipite column and were done in the 18th century by Higinio Chavez. All were done in white cedar and covered in gold leaf. In the main altarpiece is a painting of God, the Father at the crown done by Miguel Cabrera, Underneath is an image of the Immaculate Conception with Saint Joachim and Saint Anne on the sides. Underneath this is an image of John the Baptist with Saint Joseph next to him. The altar also includes images of two martyrs who died in Japan. In the center of the altarpiece is the image of Company of Jesus co-founder Saint Francis Xavier with a flaming heart shown on his chest, symbolizing divine love.

The main altar and the side altars are related thematically. Those on the presbytery side are dedicated to two of the most important Jesuit saints (Saints Ignatius of Loyola and Saint Joseph) and the altars on the other side are dedicated to those of the Third Order of the Company of Jesus, such as Francis of Borgia, shown with a crowned skull, Aloysius Gonzaga and Stanislav of Kotska. One other altarpiece is dedicated to the Virgin of Guadalupe and was completed in 1756. This altar contains an image of this Virgin as she appeared to Juan Diego as well as other saints associated with harvests, such as Saint Barbara.

In the second section of the nave is the Chapel of the Virgin of Loreto, which has a portal that is a replica of the house of Loreto. In the back of the temple is the Alcove of the Virgin and the Chapel of the Relic of Saint Joseph. The House of Loreto is, by tradition, considered to be the home of the Virgin Mary, and behind it there is an alcove dedicated to the Virgin of Loreto. Near here is a very small room dedicated to a relic supposedly of Saint Joseph. Next to this is the presbytery and the sacristy, which is filled with oil paintings. The Church of San Francisco Javier, the Loreto Chapel and the Alcove of the Virgin of Loreto are considered to be works of art in themselves.

== Church of San Pedro Apostol ==
To the left of the Church of San Francisco Javier is the Church of San Pedro Apostol with its main entrance facing the atrium and done in Neoclassic style. It is the only part of the museum complex that still preserves its religious function and services.

== Gallery ==
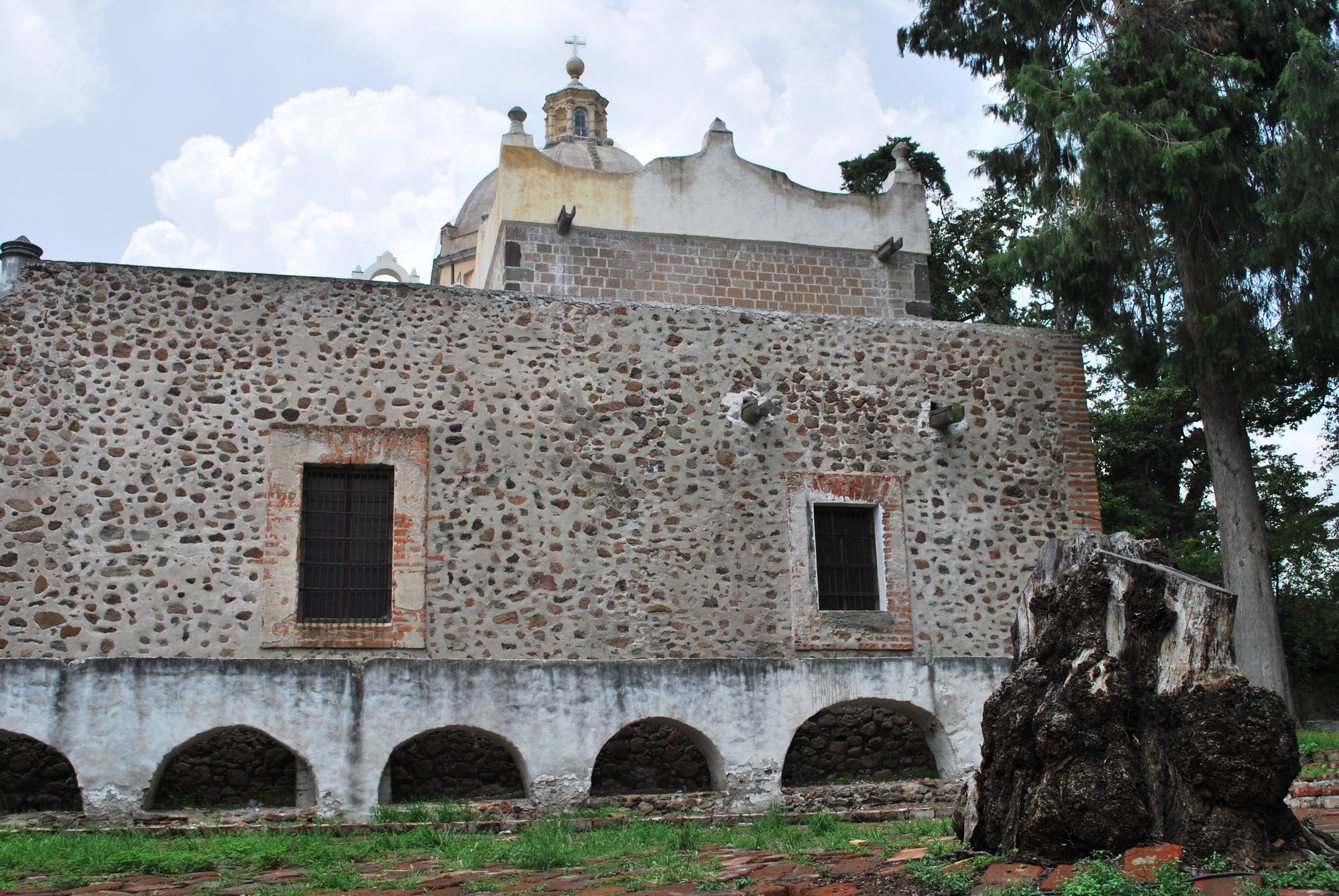
Portion of the museum complex with college's water collection system

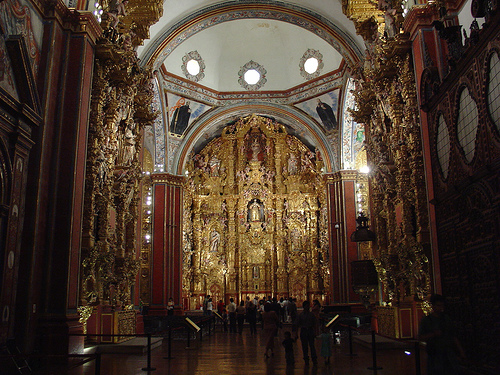
Interior of the church

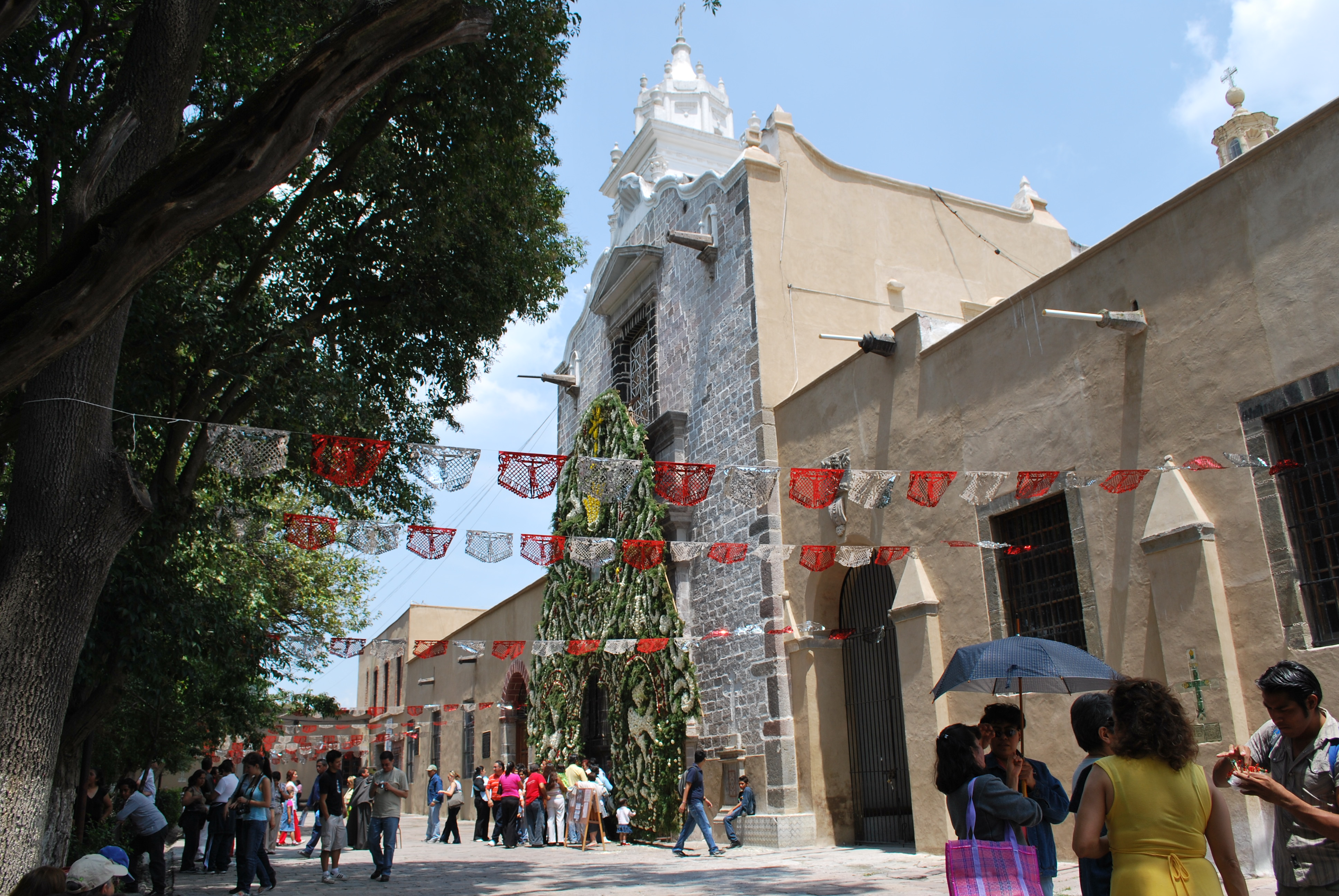
Parish of San Pedro Apostle of Tepotzotlán

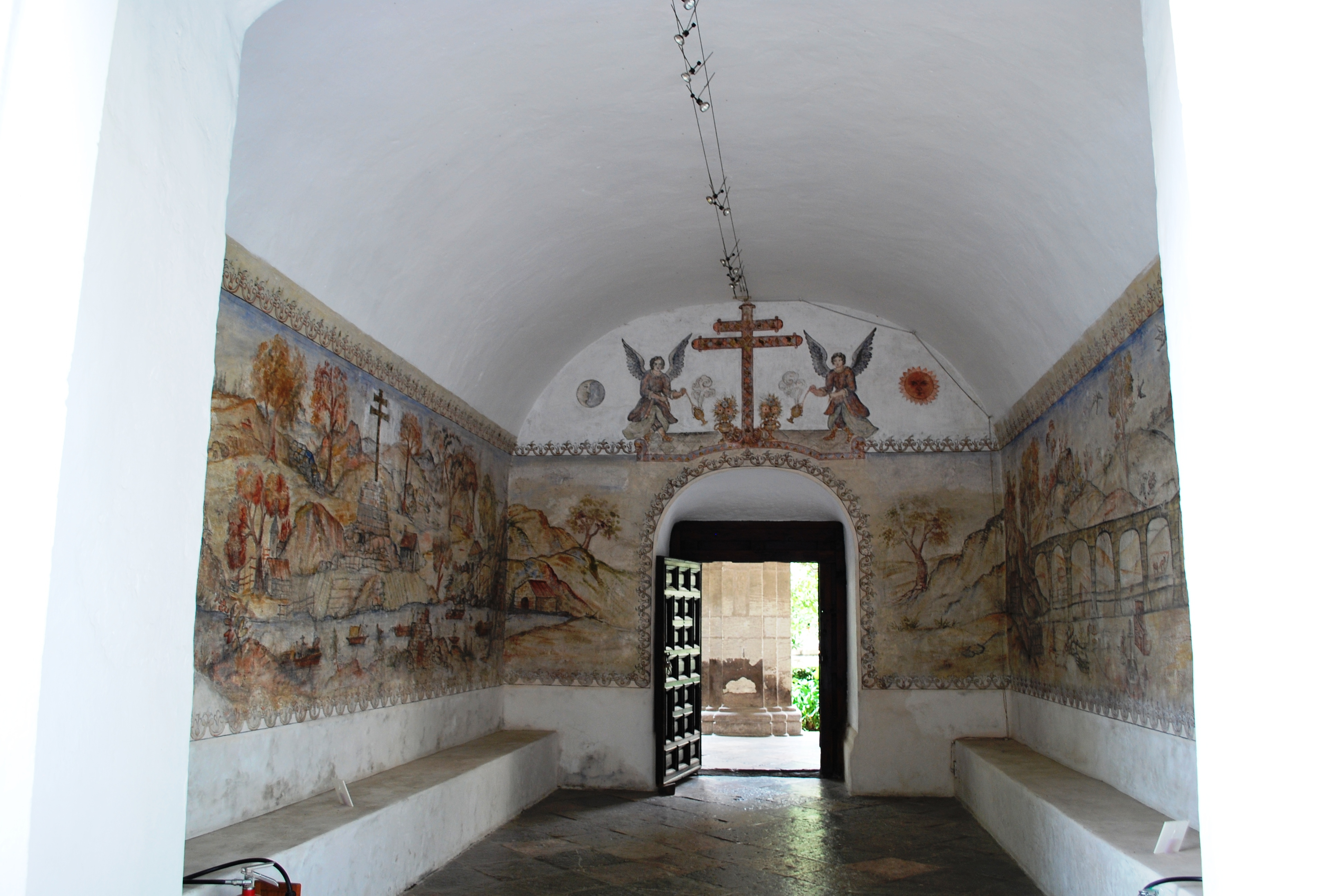
Murals in the Museum

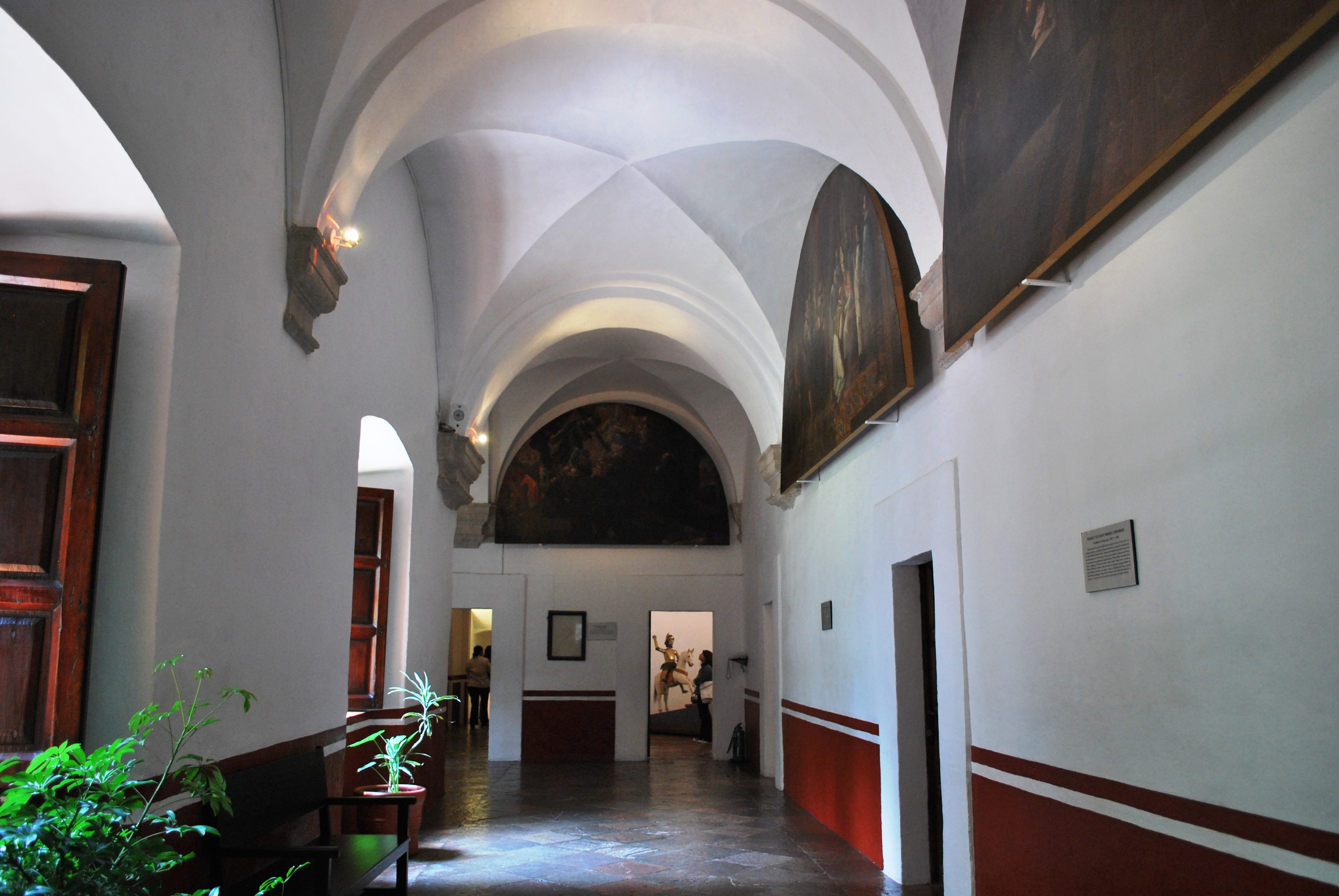
One of the hallways of the college complex

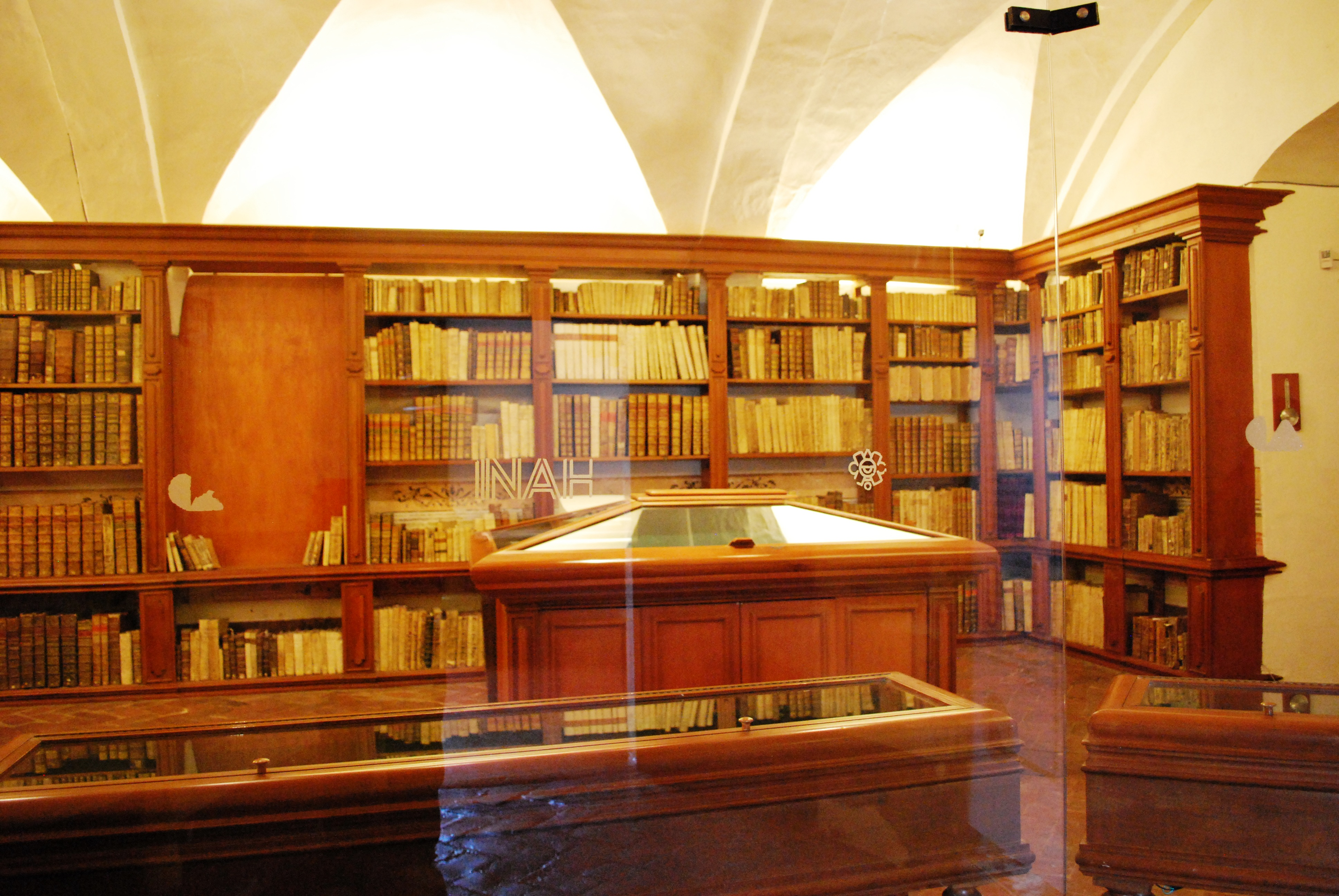
View of the college's library

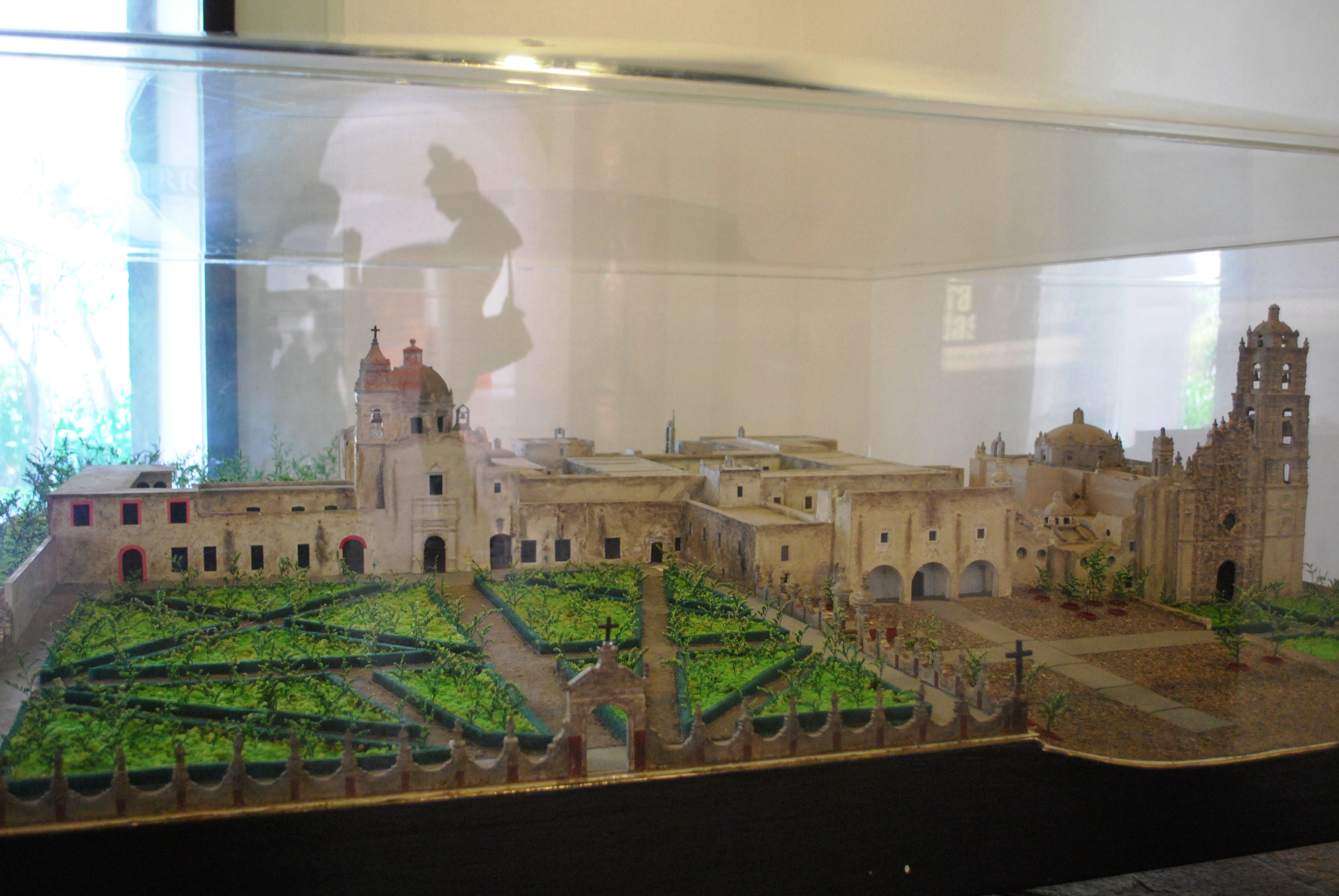
Model of the museum with Churches of San Francisco Javier and San Pedro Apostol

== See also ==
- List of Jesuit sites
- Camino Real de Tierra Adentro
