= Health Initiative of the Americas =

- Abbreviation: HIA (Spanish: ISA Iniciativa de Salud de las Américas)
- Founded: 2001
- Founder: Xochitl Castañeda
- Purpose: Latino Immigrant and Migrant Health
- Location: Berkeley, California, US
- Region served: United States, Mexico, Canada, Guatemala, Honduras, Colombia, Ecuador, Peru, Brazil, Venezuela, Uruguay
- Website: hia.berkeley.edu

The Health Initiative of the Americas (HIA; Spanish: Iniciativa de Salud de las Américas, ISA) is a Latino program focusing mainly on migrant and immigrant health issues. It is part of the School of Public Health at the University of California, Berkeley (UCB).

HIA works in collaboration with nine Latin American countries: Mexico, Colombia, Ecuador, Guatemala, Honduras, Peru, Brazil, Venezuela and Uruguay.

== History ==
HIA began as the California-Mexico Health Initiative (CMHI) in January 2001 as part of the California Policy Research Center at the University of California. The Initiative was created with the intention to raise awareness about the health challenges Mexican immigrants and migrants face while living in the US and working with them through health promotion and education to improve their health and well-being. As the Initiative grew, several other Latin American nations began to contribute to its efforts. In 2007, CMHI became HIA to better represent all of the Latin American countries it now partners with. In 2015, HIA started leading the Health working group of the UC Mexico Initiative.

== Mission and purpose ==
HIA draws upon the multidisciplinary scholarship and the moral calling of UC Berkeley faculty and students to produce new knowledge through action-oriented research; teaching and mentoring; and service and community engagement programs to reduce the health disparities of the less advantaged Latino population in the United States.

HIA's programs involve governments, academia, the private sector, and community-based organizations. HIA is considered one of the world's leading programs on health and migration, instigating the largest public health social movement in the Americas with the endorsement of over 10,000 agencies and 20,000 volunteers. Its advisory board is composed of 20 distinguished leaders.

== Action-oriented research areas ==
Scientific-based activities to inform and influence policy changes and to produce new knowledge are currently operated by HIA through:

The Migration and Health Research Program (PIMSA) (by its Spanish abbreviation for Programa de Investigacion en Migracion y Salud), is the largest US-Mexico leading academic network of researchers and doctoral students generating scientific literature in this field. It translates findings to inform decision makers, the media, and service providers and produces health education materials for immigrants and advocates. Since 2013 over 100 grants have supported multidisciplinary binational teams. Its main partners are Mexico's Secretariat of Health (SSA), National Council for Science and Technology (CONACYT), the National Autonomous University of Mexico (UNAM); the University of Texas at El Paso and the University of Arizona. The program is co-administered by the California Program on Access to Care and HIA from UCB School of Public Health.

The Center of Expertise on Migration and Health (COEMH) is one of three UC Global Health Institute centers producing knowledge to forge sustainable improvements in the health of migrant and refugee populations.

The Migration and Health Research Center (MAHRC), a collaborative program between UC Berkeley and UC Davis, conducts research and disseminates findings through social media and symposiums.

The Resource Development Center is responsible for the production of culturally sensitive bilingual resources for health educators, students, faculty, health providers, and the general public. It is founded on the premise that public health research should produce knowledge to forge improvements in the health of mobile populations.

The Binational Policy Forum on Migration and Global Health is an annual event in collaboration with SSA, Mexico's Secretariat of Foreign Affairs (SRE), and the Unit of Migration Policy of the Mexican Secretariat of the Interior (SEGOB). HIA coordinates this forum with key decision makers, legislators, academics, and students to link evidence-based research with policy recommendations.

== Teaching and mentoring ==
Graduate courses that focus on the effects migration has on the health and disease issues of communities in the countries of origin, transit, and destination are taught at UCB and UCD. Successful public health interventions targeting those populations are analyzed. HIA also develops cultural immersion exchange programs to mentor those working with migrant families. These training programs are tailored to UC medical, nursing, public health, and pharmacy students as well as health professionals and Promotoras/es de Salud. Through the Summer Institute on Migration and Global Health, faculty, students and professionals working with migrant communities around the world learn about different health issues that affect mobile populations. International experts present on diverse topics from a multidisciplinary perspective.

== Service and community engagement programs ==
Binational Health Week is a grass-roots movement directly reaching over 500,000 underserved Latinos annually in 46 California counties, and is fully operational in 40 other states in the United States and 3 provinces of Canada through the leadership of the Secretariats of Health and of Foreign Affairs of the participating Latin American countries. This mobilization of thousands is recognized as the largest single volunteer effort to support the health and health care needs of Mexican and other Latino immigrants in the US and Canada. Through the Binational Zacatecas Health Initiative (IBIZA), thousands of Zacatecan immigrants are reached.

== Coordination of transnational governmental relations ==
As a result of its bilateral agreements with governmental institutions of 9 Latin American countries (Mexico, Guatemala, El Salvador, Honduras, Colombia, Ecuador, Brazil, Bolivia, and Peru) and direct communication with over 170 consulates in the United States and Canada, HIA is positioned to address, from a public health perspective, the health access disparities faced by immigrants from Latin America and opportunities to improve their lives.

== Potential for growth and development ==
HIA seeks to continue to build on its work by stabilizing and strengthening its leadership and operations. It plans to explore opportunities and partnerships to expand and diversify its resources to more effectively respond to the opportunities to improve the quality of life of less-advantaged Latino immigrants in the United States of America.

== Honors and proclamations ==
HIA and its operations have been honored by several legislators, legislative bodies and local governments, including:

- Rep. Ellen Tauscher
- Rep. Jim Costa
- Rep. Diane E. Watson
- Former California State Assemblywoman Nicole M. Parra
- California State Senators Dean Florez and Roy Ashburn
- The California State Legislature
- The U.S. House of Representatives
- The California counties of Alameda, Del Norte, Fresno, Imperial, Los Angeles, Merced, Napa, Orange, San Bernardino, San Diego, San Francisco, Santa Clara, Sonoma, Tulare, and Ventura

== Partners and Benefactors ==
HIA works in conjunction with several different national organizations in various countries, and receives funding from the University of California, Berkeley and other non-profits. Among their partners are:

- El Instituto de Los Mexicanos en el Exterior (IME)
- California HealthCare Foundation
- Mexican Social Security Institute (IMSS)
- Mexican Institute of Radio (IMER)
- Mexican National Institute of Women (INMUJERES)
- AltaMed Health Services Corporation
- Mexico’s National Population Council (CONAPO)
- National Autonomous University of Mexico (UNAM)
- Public Health Institute (PHI)
- Farmworker Justice
- National Academy of Medicine (Mexico)
- California Human Development Corporation
- Congress of Mexico
- California State Legislature, Latino Caucus
- University of Arizona
- Texas A&M University
- University of Illinois at Chicago
- California State University system
- Clinicas de Salud del Pueblo, Inc.
- University of California, Office of the President
- University of California Medical, Nursing, and Pharmacy Schools
- The Secretariat of Health of Mexico
- The Secretariat of Foreign Affairs of Mexico
- The California Endowment
- California Department of Health Services
- California HIV/AIDS Research Program
- California Program on Access to Care (CPAC)
- Robert Wood Johnson Foundation
- The California Wellness Foundation
- US-Mexico Border Health Commission
- Council of Mexican Federations in North America (COFEM)
- California Primary Care Association
- Mexico’s National Council of Science and Technology (CONACYT)
- Benemerita Autonomous University of Puebla (BUAP)
- Mexican Foundation for Health (FUNSALUD)
- Health Net
- Fundación Paisano, A.C.
- University of Texas at El Paso
- State University of New York (SUNY)
- University of New Mexico
- Family Health Care Network
- Clinicas de Salud del Valle de Salinas
- San Diego County Office of Border Health
- Ministries of Foreign Affairs of Guatemala, El Salvador, Honduras, Colombia, Ecuador, and Peru

== Board of Advisors (in alphabetical order) ==
- Luis A. Alejo, Assembly Member/Vice-chair, California State Assembly
- Toni G. Atkins, Speaker of the House, State Assembly, California State Legislature
- Frinne Azuara Yarzabal, Head, Program IMSS Opportunities Mexican Institute of Social Security (IMSS)
- Stefano Bertozzi, Dean, School of Public Health, UC Berkeley
- Xochitl Castañeda, Director, Health Initiative of the Americas
- Carmela Castellano-Garcia, CEO, California Primary Care Association
- Carlos Polo, Director, Directorate General for Peruvian Communities Abroad, Ministry of Foreign Relations of Peru
- Patricia Chemor, General Secretary, National Population Council of Mexico (CONAPO)
- Hilda Davila, Director General of Foreign Affairs at the Secretariat of Health of Mexico
- Francisco de la Torre, Director, Institute of Mexicans Abroad (IME), Secretariat of Foreign Affairs of Mexico
- Ivonne Forero, Coordinator, "Colombia Nos Une" Program, Ministry of Foreign Affairs of Colombia
- Mary Hall, associate director for Policy, Office of Minority Health and Health Equity, Centers for Disease Control and Prevention (CDC)
- Maria Landazuri de Mora, Vice Minister, Ministry of Foreign Affairs and Human Mobility of Ecuador
- Ricardo Lara, Senator, California State Senate
- Sylvia Marin, President, Council of Mexican Federations in North America (COFEM)
- Dr. Jose Narro Robles, President, National Autonomous University of Mexico (UNAM)
- Oscar Padilla Lam, Viceminister, Vice Ministry of Foreign Affairs of Guatemala
- Castulo de la Rocha, CEO and President, AltaMed Health Services Corporation
- Julia Tagueña, associate director, Scientific and Academic Development, National Council of Science and Technology (CONACYT)
- Omar de la Torre de la Mora, Head, Political Migration Unit, Secretariat of Governance Mexico
- Diana Valladares, Viceminister, Secretariat of Foreign Affairs of Honduras

== See also ==
- Migration and Health Research Center
- Marc Schenker
- Xochitl Castañeda
