= Xochitl Castañeda =

Mexican-American public health official and anthropologist

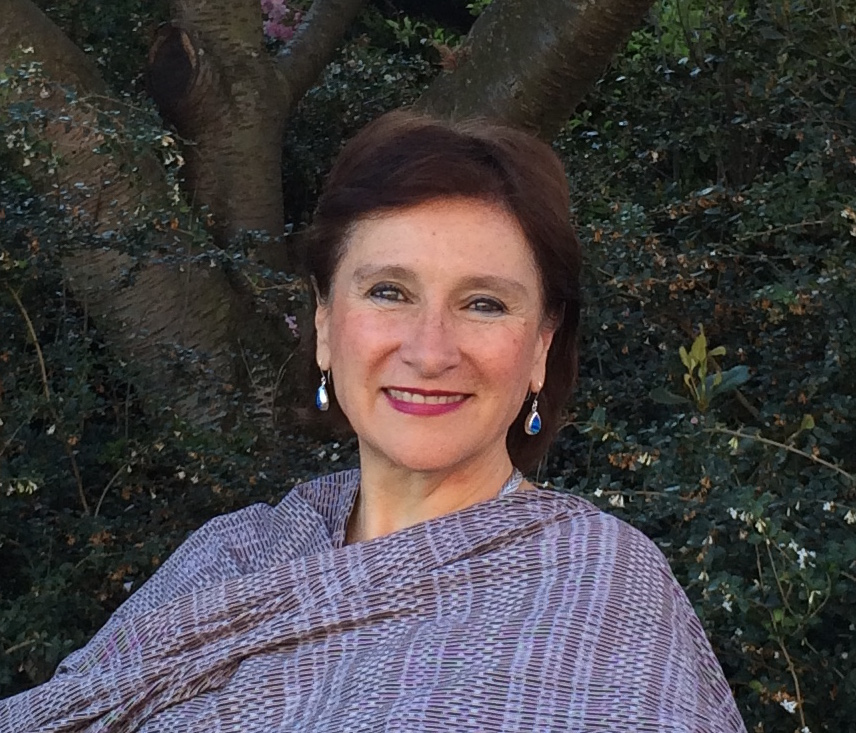
- Castañeda in 2015
- Education: Guatemala and Mexico; postdoctoral fellowships at UCSF, Harvard University, and University of Amsterdam
- Occupations: Public health official, medical anthropologist
- Employer: University of California, Berkeley
- Organizations: Health Initiative of the Americas (HIA), Health Education for Latinos Program (HELP)
- Known for: Founding director of the Health Initiative of the Americas
- Awards: Mexican National Award of Health (2020)
- Website: help-fund.net

Xochitl Castañeda is a Mexican-American public health official and medical anthropologist. She is the founding director of the Health Initiative of the Americas (HIA), based at the School of Public Health, University of California, Berkeley. She also established the Health Education for Latinos Program (HELP), which provides scholarships to Latino students pursuing health-related careers.

== Early life and education ==
Castañeda studied medical anthropology in Guatemala and Mexico. She later completed postdoctoral fellowships at the University of California, San Francisco, Harvard University, and the University of Amsterdam.

== Career ==
Castañeda worked for several years at Mexico's National Institute of Public Health, where she directed the Department of Reproductive Health. In 2001, she joined the University of California, Berkeley, where she became the founding director of the Health Initiative of the Americas (HIA), a program focused on improving the health of Latino immigrants through binational and community-based strategies.

Since 2008, she has also taught courses on migration and health at different University of California campuses. In 2020, she launched the Health Education for Latinos Program (HELP), a scholarship fund for Latino students in health-related fields.

== Awards ==
In 2020, Castañeda received the Mexican National Award of Health in the "Sin Fronteras" (Without Borders) category, which recognized her work on improving health services for Mexicans living abroad.

== Selected publications ==
Castañeda has authored or co-authored several books and research studies on migration and health. Selected works include:

- Health Care During Pregnancy and Birth in Rural Areas (1989)
- Mexican and Central American Immigrants in the United States: Health Care Access (2006)
- Migration and Health: Mexican Immigrant Women in the U.S. (2010)
- Migration and Health: Young Mexican Immigrants in the US (2012)
- English–Spanish Dictionary of Health-Related Terms, 4th ed. (2012)
- Migration and Health: Reflections and Challenges About the Health of Migrants (2017)
- Migration and Health: Current Challenges and Opportunities (2020)
