= Julian Segura Camacho =

Julián Segura Camacho is an author of Mexican American literature. His works have been adopted by many national university libraries, including the University of California system, and the University of Texas.

== Biography ==
Camacho was born in El Centro, California in 1969 and raised in Inglewood, California, in the Rancho del Centinela. He has been published by Rowman and Littlefield, and by Floricanto Press.

His book Huevos y la Mujer Latina: The De-Masculinization of the Macho was critiqued in the New York Daily News in 2007 by Dolores Prida.

Camacho has twice been highlighted as "Author of the Month" by the California State University, Long Beach website.

== Bibliography ==
1. The Chicano Treatise (2005) ISBN 0-7618-2937-7
2. Societal Suicide (2006) ISBN 0-7618-3514-8
3. Unwanted and Not Included: The Saga of Mexican People in the US (2006) ISBN 0-7618-3528-8
4. Huevos y la Mujer Latina: The De-Masculinization of the Macho (2007) ISBN 978-0-9796457-4-7
5. Higher Education as Ignorance: The Contempt of Mexicans in the American Educational System (2008) ISBN 0-7618-4026-5
6. "Chalino: Of Fulgor and Death (978-1-888205-08-4) by Floricanto Press.
