= Julia Tagüeña =

Mexican physicist

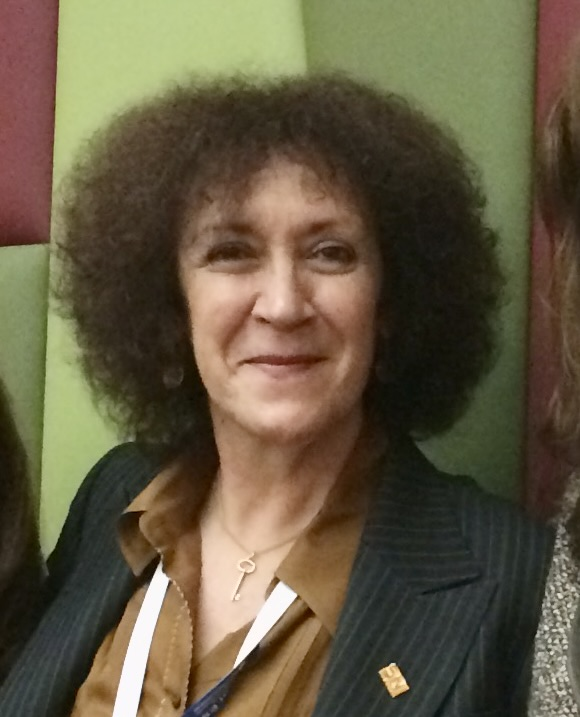

Julia Tagüeña Parga (born 21 October 1948) is a Mexican physicist from the School of Science at the National Autonomous University of Mexico (UNAM) and Doctor of Science from the University of Oxford.

She was one of the Directors for Scientific Development at the Mexican National Council of Science and Technology (CONACYT) from 2013 to 2018, and was General Director of Mexico's Science and Technology Consulting Forum (2018-2020). The main goals of the Forum is to act as an independent advisor of how science and technology should be integrated into Mexican laws (both at the state and federal level.) The Forum also acts an independent advisor to Mexico's Executive power and to Conacyt.

== Life and career ==
Tagüeña was born in Frydland, Czechoslovakia. Her father, Manuel Tagüeña, was a physicist, and her mother, Carmen Parga, studied philosophy. Tagüeña is married.

Tagüeña studied Physics at the National Autonomous University of Mexico. She obtained a PhD at Oxford University. Her main field of research are solid-state physics and renewable energies. Tagüeña has written 11 textbooks for high school and undergraduate students and published over 50 articles on solid state research in international journals.

For over 25 years Tagüeña has been a research professor at the National Autonomous University of Mexico (UNAM).

From 2002 to 2005, Tagüeña held the position of the Executive Directorate of the Network for the Popularization of Science and Technology for Latin America and the Caribbean (RedPOP). Between 2004 and 2008, Tagüeña was Director General for the Dissemination of Science in the UNAM.

From 2005 to 2007, she was vice president of the Mexican Association of Museums and Science and Technology Centers. In 2009-2010, Tagüeña was a Secretary of Morelos Academy of Sciences.

From 2010 to 2012, she served as a president of the Mexican Society for the Dissemination of Science and Technology.

For the short period from November 2012 to January 2013 Tagüeña was a Director of the UNAM Energy Research Center, and until March 2013 she was in charge of the office of the Institute of Renewable Energies.

From 2013 to 2018 Tagüeña was the Deputy General Director for Scientific Development at the Mexican National Council of Science and Technology. In January 2019, Tagüeña was appointed as a general coordinator of the Scientific and Technological Advisory Forum and will held this position until 31 December 2020.

== Publications (selection) ==
- 1999 – Física
- 2000 – Los elementos de Elementa, museo de ciencias
- 2003 – Calor y temperature
- 2003 – Arte y ciencia en Universum: dos caras de una moneda
- 2005 – Los museos latinoamericanos de ciencia y la equidad
- 2005 – Lo “glocal”, nueva perspectiva para desarrollar museos de ciencia
- 2007 – Museología de la ciencia: 15 años de experiencia
- 2008 – Fuentes renovables de energía y desarrollo sustentable
- 2013 – La case dorada: fuentes renovables de energía
- 2013 – Secador solar de alimentos
- 2015 – Public communication of science in Mexico: Past, present and future of the profession
