= Xochitl Dominguez Benetton =

Mexican scientist

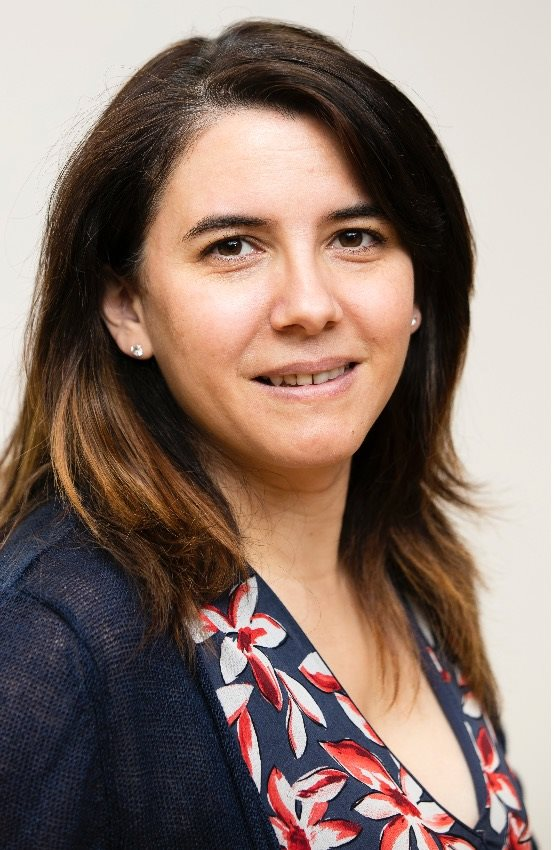
- Xochitl Dominguez Benetton in 2019
- Born: Xochitl Dominguez Benetton; July 23, 1980 (age 45); Mexico City, Mexico
- Education: National Polytechnic Institute of Mexico (BS); Mexican Petroleum Institute (DSc)
- Known for: Electrochemical engineering Gas-diffusion electrocrystallization Bioelectrochemistry
- Scientific career
- Fields: Electrochemistry
- Institutions: Flemish Institute for Technological Research

Xochitl Dominguez Benetton (born 23 July 1980 in Mexico City) is a Mexican scientist, graduated as a Doctor of Science at the Mexican Petroleum Institute in 2008. She conducts research at the Flemish Institute for Technological Research since 2011.

She is the inventor of the gas-diffusion electrocrystallization process, which has been heralded as a Great EU-funded innovation by the Innovation Radar of the European Commission. She is renown in Mexico and Europe for her scientific and patenting activity in the domains of metal recovery from wastewater and synthesis of nanoparticles.

== Honours ==
- She is a member of the Mexican National System of Researchers since 2011, holding the SNI II distinction since 2019.
- She received the award Distinguished Mexicans (in Spanish) in 2022, which is the highest honour a Mexican can receive owing their outstanding trajectory abroad Mexico.
