= Nahuatl name =

Given name in the Nahuatl language

A Nahuatl name is a given name in the Nahuatl language that was used by the Aztecs.

== Aztecs ==
Aztec male names from the 1540 Census n=1300					1st Component			2nd Component		
Commonality	Frequency	Nahuatl	IPA	English	Nahuatl	IPA	English	Nahuatl	IPA	English
1st	74	Yāōtl	[ˈjaːoːt͡ɬ]	war						
2nd	66	Matlalihuitl	[mat͡ɬaˈliwit͡ɬ]	blue-green feather	matlalin	[maˈt͡ɬalin]	blue-green	Xōchixihuitl	[ˈʃoːt͡ʃi'iwit͡ɬ]	crystal flower
3rd	59	Nōchēhuatl	[noːt͡ʃˈeːwat͡ɬ]	consistent	nōchtli	[ˈnoːt͡ʃt͡ɬi]	cactus fruit	ēhuatl	[ˈeːwat͡ɬ]	skin
4th	48	Coātl	[ˈkoaːt͡ɬ]	snake						
5th	19	Tōtōtl	[ˈtoːtoːt͡ɬ]	bird						
6th	18	Cuāuhtl	[kʷaːʍt͡ɬ]	eagle						
7th	17	Tōchtli	[ˈtoːt͡ʃt͡ɬi]	rabbit						
8th	16	Zōlin	[ˈsoːlin]	quail						
9th	12	Mātlal	[ˈmaːt͡ɬal]	net						
10th	12	Xōchitl	[ˈʃoːt͡ʃit͡ɬ]	flower						
additional Aztec male names from a 1590 document					1st Component			2nd Component		
		Nahuatl	IPA	English	Nahuatl	IPA	English	Nahuatl	IPA	English
		Mazatl	[ˈmasat͡ɬ]	deer						
		Cuetzpalli	[kʷet͡sˈpalːi]	lizard						
		Ōlli	[ˈoːlːi]	rubber						
		Itzcuīntli	[it͡sˈkʷiːnt͡ɬi]	dog						
		Tlālli	[ˈt͡ɬaːlːi]	earth						
		Huitzitl	[ˈwit͡sit͡ɬ]	hummingbird						
		Ōcēlōtl	[oːˈseːloːt͡ɬ]	jaguar						
		Ozomatli	[osoˈmat͡ɬi]	monkey						
		Cuetlāchtli	[kʷeˈt͡ɬɑːt͡ʃt͡ɬi]	wolf						
		Tecolōtl	[teˈkoloːt͡ɬ]	horned owl						
		Miztli	[ˈmist͡ɬi]	mountain lion						
		Cipac	[ˈsipak]	crocodile	non-name form-->			cipactli	[siˈpakt͡ɬi]	crocodile
		Ocuil	[ˈokʷil]	worm	non-name form-->			ocuilin	[oˈkʷilin]	worm
		Cuīxtli	[ˈkʷiːʃt͡ɬi]	kite (bird)						
		Tapayaxi	[tapaˈjaʃi]	toad						
		Cōzahtli	[koːˈsɑʔt͡ɬi]	weasel						
		Necuametl	[neˈkʷamet͡ɬ]	maguey						
		Huitztecol	[wit͡sˈtekol]	dark brown						
		Ēlōxōchitl	[eːloːˈʃoːt͡ʃit͡ɬ]	magnolia	ēlōtl	[ˈeːloːt͡ɬ]	green corn cob	xōchitl	[ˈʃoːt͡ʃit͡ɬ]	flower
		Xōchipepe	[ʃoːt͡ʃiˈpepe]	flower gatherer	xōchitl	[ˈʃoːt͡ʃit͡ɬ]	flower	pepena	[peˈpena]	verb to choose
Aztec female names from the 1540 Census n=1205					1st Component			2nd Component		
Commonality	Frequency	Nahuatl	IPA	English	Nahuatl	IPA	English	Nahuatl	IPA	English
1st	313	Tēyacapan	[teːjaˈkapan]	first born	non-name form -->			tēyacapantli	[teːjakaˈpant͡ɬi]	first born
2nd	182	Tlahco	[ˈt͡ɬaʔko]	middle (born)						
3rd	182	Teicuih	[teˈikʷiʔ]	younger sister						
4th	151	Necāhual	[neˈkaːwal]	survivor	ne-	[ne]	prefix	cāhualli	[kaːwalːi]	someone left behind
5th	53	Xōcoh	[ˈʃoːkoʔ]	youngest sister						
6th	42	Centehua	[senˈtewa]	only one						
7th	38	Xōcoyōtl	[ʃoːˈkojoːt͡ɬ]	youngest child						
8th	22	Tlahcoēhua	[t͡ɬaʔkoˈeːwa]	middle one	Tlahco	[ˈt͡ɬaʔko]	middle	ēhuatl	[ˈeːwat͡ɬ]	skin
9th	15	Tepin	[ˈtepin]	little one						
10th	15	Cihuātōn	[siˈwaːtoːn]	little woman	non-name form -->			Cihuātōntli	[siwaːˈtoːnt͡ɬi]	little woman
additional Aztec female names from a 1590 document					1st Component			2nd Component		
		Nahuatl	IPA	English	Nahuatl	IPA	English	Nahuatl	IPA	English
		Papā	[ˈpapaː]	flag	non-name form -->			pāmitl	[ˈpaːmit͡ɬ]	flag
		Ēlōxōchitl	[eːloːˈʃoːt͡ʃit͡ɬ]	magnolia	ēlōtl	[ˈeːloːt͡ɬ]	green corn cob	xōchitl	[ˈʃoːt͡ʃit͡ɬ]	flower
		Xīlōxōch	[ʃiːˈloːʃoːt͡ʃ]	calliandra	xīlōtl	[ˈʃiːloːt͡ɬ]	small, tender green maize	xōchitl	[ˈʃoːt͡ʃit͡ɬ]	flower
		Miyāoaxōchitl	[mijaːoaˈʃoːt͡ʃit͡ɬ]	maize tassel flower	miyāhuatl	[miˈjaːwat͡ɬ]	maize tassel	xōchitl	[ˈʃoːt͡ʃit͡ɬ]	flower
		Mizquixāhual	[miskiˈʃɑːˈwɑl]	mesquite face paint	mizquitl	[ˈmiskit͡ɬ]	mesquite tree	xāhualli	[ʃɑːˈwɑlːi]	shaving

There was a greater variety of Nahuatl names for Aztec males than for Aztec females. The meanings of the Aztec female names were mostly about birth order.
