= Tepotzotlán =

- Town and municipality
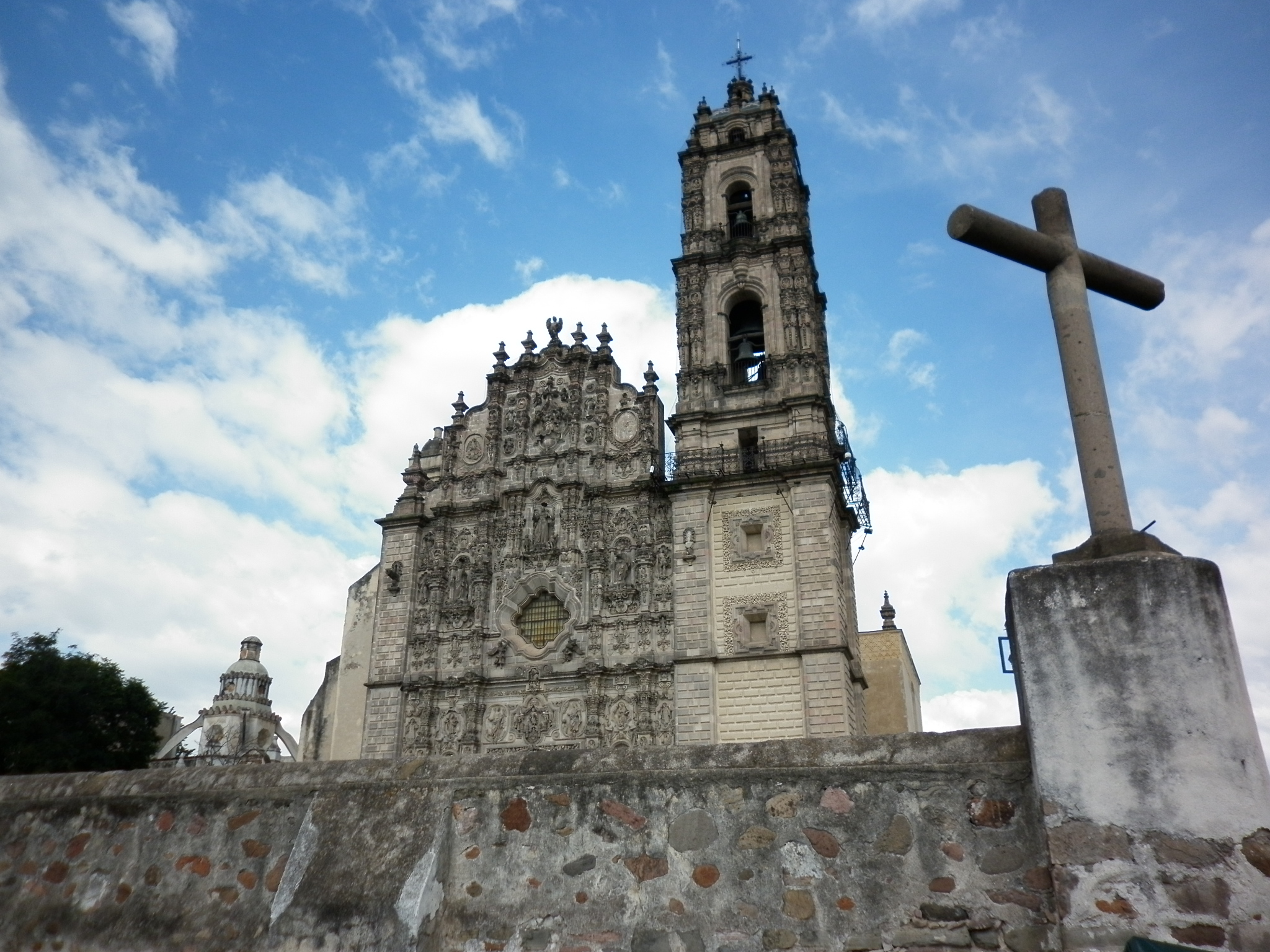

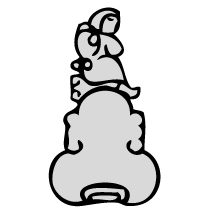
- Coat of arms

- Location within State of Mexico
- Coordinates: 19°42′58″N 99°13′25″W
- Country: Mexico
- State: State of Mexico
- Founded: 1525
- Municipal Status: 1814

Government
  - Municipal President: Marcos Márquez Mecado (2006–2009)

Area
  - Municipality: 208.83 km^{2} (80.63 sq mi)
- Elevation (of seat): 2,300 m (7,500 ft)

Population (2005) Municipality
  - Municipality: 67,724
  - Seat: 39,374
- Time zone: UTC-6 (CST)
- Postal code (of seat): 54600
- Website: http://www.tepotzotlan.gob.mx/

UNESCO World Heritage Site
- Official name: Former college of San Francisco Javier in Tepotzotlán
- Part of: Camino Real de Tierra Adentro
- Criteria: Cultural: (ii)(iv)
- Reference: 1351-001
- Inscription: 2010 (34th Session)
- Area: 6.59 ha (16.3 acres)
- Buffer zone: 40.59 ha (100.3 acres)

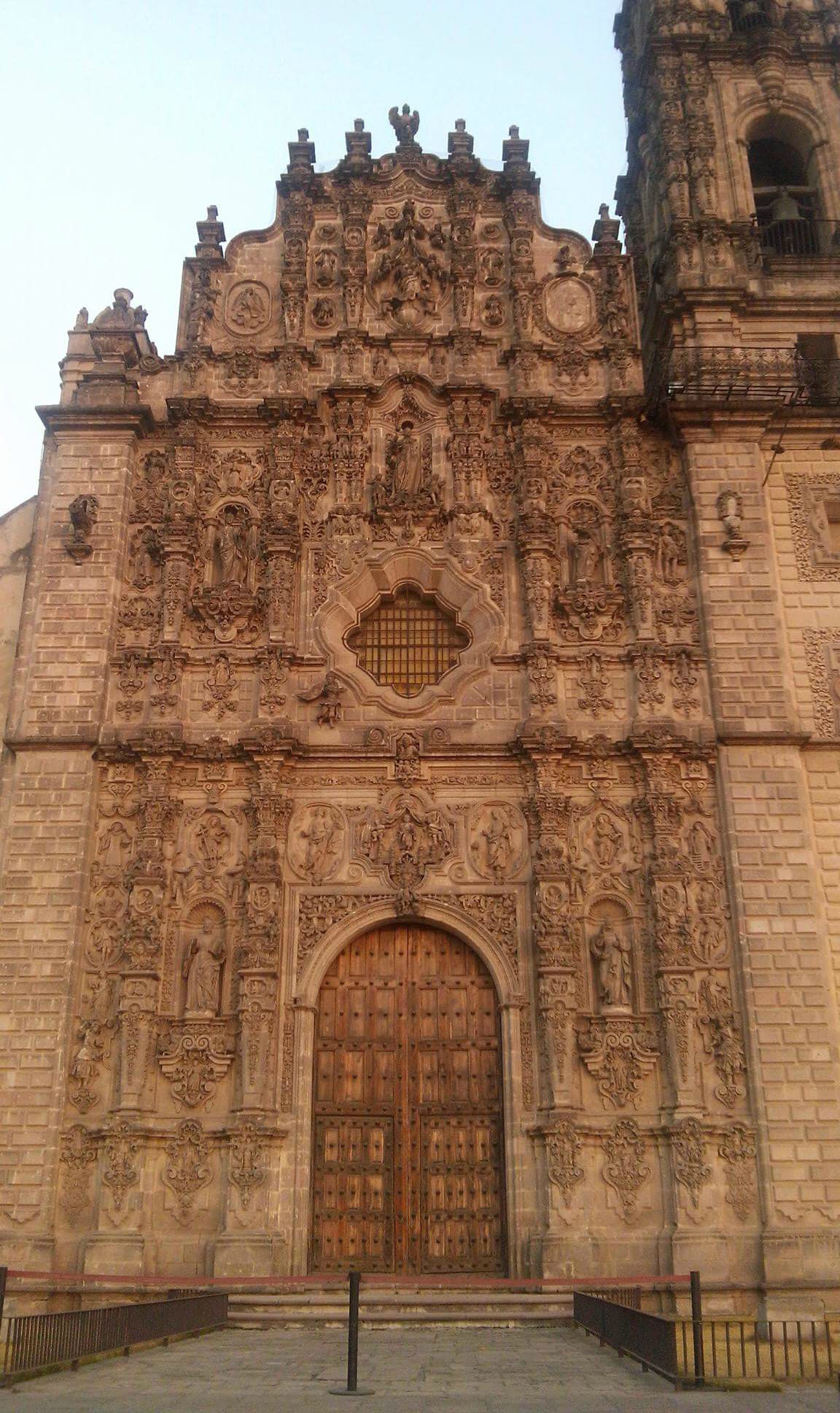
Tepotzotlan Cathedral

Tepotzotlán (Spanish: [tepotsoˈtlan]) is a city and a municipality in the Mexican state of Mexico. It is located 40 km (25 mi) northwest of Mexico City about a 45-minute drive along the Mexico City–Querétaro road at marker number 41. In Aztec times, the area was the center of a dominion that negotiated to keep most of its independence in return with being allied with the Aztec Triple Alliance. Later, it would also be part of a "Republic of the indigenous," allowing for some autonomy under Spanish rule as well. The town became a major educational center during the colonial period when the Jesuits established the College of San Francisco Javier. The college complex that grew from its beginnings in 1580 would remain an educational center until 1914. Today this complex houses the Museo del Virreinato (Museum of the Vice Regal or Colonial Period), with one of the largest collections of art and other objects from this time period.

The name Tepotzotlán is of Nahuatl origin and means "among humpbacks," referring to the shape of the hills that surround this area. The oldest surviving Aztec glyph for this area is found in the Codex Osuna, which features a humpbacked person sitting on top of a hill. This is now the symbol of the municipality. Another version of the glyph shows a humpbacked person defending a "teocalli" or sacred precinct. The municipality also has a lesser-known European-style coat-of-arms. This contains the officially adopted version of the glyph in the upper part, a representation of the Arcos del Sitio, the facade of the Church of San Francisco Javier and chimneys and a tractor representing both the agriculture and industry found here. Underneath these are written the words "Libertad, Cultura y Trabajo" (Liberty, Culture and Work).

== History of the city and municipality ==
The first ethnic group was most likely the Otomi, who settled here between 2500 BCE. and 100 CE (pre-classic period). At about 100 C. E., the Teotihuacan became ascendant, with the Otomis here subject to Teotihuacan until about 700 CE. During the period that Teotihuacan was in decline, a Nahua-Chichimeca tribe headed by Chicontonatiuh, took control of this area, along with what is now Maxuexhuacan, Chapa de Mota, and Huehuetoca. After the death of Chichontonatuih, nine other chiefs ruled this same area until 1174. After this time other Nahua and Chichimeca people began to arrive here and the rest of the Valley of Mexico. The area then came to be ruled by a chieftain named Xotlotl, who explored the valley's lakes and took the first census ever here, counting about a million people living in the Valley of Mexico. Rule over this area passed from father to son peacefully for a number of generations until the early 14th century. Conflict with neighboring Xaltocan and Texcoco led to a number of political intrigues, including the assassination of one of the few female lords in the Valley of Mexico, Ehuatlicuetzin in 1372. In the first part of the 15th century, the Aztec Empire began to consolidate and extend its power north. At this time the area was ruled by Ayactlacatzin and the area was called Xaquintehcutli.1460, Ayactlacatzin negotiated an alliance with Moctezuma I to allow this dominion, renamed Tepotzotlán, to remain semi-independent after Azcapotzalco fell to the Triple Alliance in 1428. This arrangement stayed intact until the fall of Aztec capital of Tenochtitlan in 1521.

Macuilxochitzin was governor of Tepotzotlán when the Spanish arrived here in 1520. This dominion opposed the Spanish invasion. When the Spanish subdued the main city, they destroyed everything in their path.

Evangelization work was begun here in 1525 by friars Alonso de Guadalupe and Alonso de Herrero, who built a hermitage over the ruins of the old city in Tepotzotlán in the same year. The Church of San Pedro Apostol sits on the site of the hermitage today. These were followed by Toribio de Benavente Motolina and Jerónimo de Mendieta of the Franciscans. By 1547, Tepotzotlan had become a center of the spread of the new faith, with surrounding villages under its jurisdiction.

Diego Nequametzin, son of Macuilxochitzin, succeeded his father and ruled under the Spanish from 1534 to 1549, but severe economic problems as well as epidemics of typhoid and smallpox decimated the population here. Eventually, the area became completely under the control of an encomienda under Juan de Ortega. When Ortega died, the land became property of the Spanish Crown, who created a "corregimiento" under the dominion of the nearby city of Cuautitlán. The indigenous here were granted limited autonomy in the way of a "Republic of the indigenous", with Pedro de San Agustín as the first governor.

In 1580, the first of the Jesuits arrived, eventually established three schools; one for the training of Jesuit priests in indigenous languages, a school for indigenous boys called San Martín to teach Spanish, reading, writing, religion, music and trade skills, and last a college to train Jesuit novices. The first two were founded completely in Tepotzotlán but the third and largest was due to the movement of priest training from the College of San Pedro y San Pablo in Mexico City to here in 1585. It was named the College of San Francisco Javier and all three would be housed in the same complex, bringing Tepozotlán fame as one of the most important educational centers of New Spain. This college would produce a number of famous Jesuits such as Carlos de Sigüenza y Góngora, Francisco Javier Clavijero, Francisco Javier Alegre and Eusebio Francisco Kino.

These Jesuit schools, along with the large number of haciendas and ranches that the Jesuits owned in this area, pushed both the cultural and economic development of this region north of Mexico City and would continue to do so until the Jesuits were expelled from Mexico in 1767. After the expulsion, the school complex was ceded to regular clergy for the training of priests under the name of Real Colegio de Instrucción Retiro Voluntario y Corrección para el Clero Secular until it was abandoned permanently in the early 20th century. Tepozotlán became a municipality in 1814, patterning itself after the precepts contained in the Cadiz Constitution, the Declaration of Independence and the Constitution of Apatzingan. The municipality remained rural and quiet until the Mexico City-Querétaro highway was built in 1954. This highway would have a profound impact on the economic development of Tepotzotlán, making it a part of the fast-growing Mexico City Metropolitan Area from the mid-20th century on.

== The city ==
The city of Tepotzotlán is located very close to the Mexico City-Querétaro highway, which cuts across the municipality. It is made up of the neighborhoods of San Martín, Tlacateco, Texcacoa, Capula, Las Animas, El Trébol, Ricardo Flores Magón and Puente Grande. Because of the highway and the growth of the Mexico City metropolitan area, the city is experiencing rapid growth. Population is growing an average of 3.5% annually. The highway has provided a route for commuters since it was built in the 1950s enticing people to move out of the city to here. This movement of people has accelerated since the 1985 Mexico City earthquake as the Tepotzotlán area is far less prone to violent shaking than Mexico City proper.

The parts of town closest to the highway are the most developed, hosting industrial parks and housing developments. However, the center of town has maintained its colonial-era appearance with cobblestone alleys, arcades and plazas. There is a small, secular plaza in front of the main church, which contains a kiosk at which many cultural events take place. The municipal market is known for its food stands selling traditional dishes as quesadillas, sopes, pambazos, and tacos as well as barbacoa, and carnitas. More elaborate dishes here include cabrito, chapulines, snails and escamoles (ant eggs) which are generally available in the area restaurants. On weekends, tianguises pop up all over the center of the town, selling food, crafts, artwork, handcrafted furniture, tile, baskets and leather items. Festivals in the town and municipality include the Festival of Flowers in March, the Feast of Saint Peter (patron saint of Tepotzotlan) in June, the Festival of the Señor del Nicho (Preciosa Sangre de Cristo) in September and the International Festival of Music in September.

The city had a population of 39,374 as of 2005 and is 2300 meters above sea level. Tepotzotlán has been named one of the Pueblos Mágicos of Mexico, mostly due to the town's center, which not only has conserved its colonial look despite its proximity to Mexico City, but also because it is the home of the Church of San Francisco Javier and the Museo de Virreinato (Museum of the Viceroyalty). Since being named a Pueblo Magico, much effort has been put into rescuing and restoring much of the buildings of the town's past.

=== Museum of Viceroyalty of New Spain ===
The Museo del Virreinato, or Museum of the Viceroyalty of New Spain (Colonial) Period, is housed in a complex that was built by the Society of Jesus or Jesuits in the 1580s. Here they established three schools. The first was dedicated to training Jesuit missionaries in the indigenous languages of Mexico, the second was to provide education to Indian boys. The third was the movement of the training of Jesuit priests from the College of San Pedro y San Pablo in Mexico City to a new facility called the College of San Francisco Javier. These schools would make Tepotzotlán one of the most prestigious educational centers in New Spain.

Most of the complex is taken up by the Museo del Virreinato situated in what used to be the College of San Francisco Javier. The Museo is considered to be one of the most impressive in the country due both to its collection and to the aesthetics of the building that houses it. The complex contains a number of interior courtyards, such as the Aljibes and the Naranjo, as well as a domestic chapel, library, dormitories, refectory, and kitchen. A wide arched passageway in the back of the complex leads to the extensive gardens area of more than 3 hectares, filled with gardens, sculptures and the original Salta de Agua fountain, which marked the end of the old Chapultepec aqueduct.

Much of its collection is made of liturgical pieces from the old Museum of Religious Art which was part of the Mexico City Cathedral. The collection is one of the largest from the Mexican colonial era. There are exhibits of non-religious everyday items from the colonial period such as silverware and other objects of precious metals, textiles and tools. The Church of San Francisco Javier is no longer used for religious services and is now part of the museum. This church contains one of the most important collections of Churrigueresque altarpieces in Mexico.

== The municipality ==
=== Geography ===
As municipal seat, the city of Tepotzotlán has governing jurisdiction over the following communities: Cañada de Cisneros, Colonia los Dolores (Ex-hacienda los Dolores), San Mateo Xoloc, San Miguel Cañadas, Santa Cruz, Santiago Cuautlalpan, Las Cabañas, Barrio de Texcacoa, Arcos del Sitio, La Concepción, El Jagüey, Lanzarote, La Pedrera (La Mina), Ex-hacienda San José la Teja, Peña Colorada, Casas Hogar Fidel Velázquez, Lumbrera Número Diez, La Luz, La Pedrera, Ejido Santiago, Santiago el Alto, Fraccionamiento Club Virreyes, Ampliación los Potros (Tres Piedras), Colonia Guadalupe, Barrio de la Luz, Rancho el Arroyo, El Puerto de los Huizaches, Las Lechuguillas, Barranca de la Pila, La Estancia II, Rancho la Joya and El Gavillero. After the seat, the largest communities in the municipality are San Mateo Xóloc, Santa Cruz, Santiago Cuahutlalpan and Cañadas de Cisneros. The total municipal population was 67,724 as of 2005. While very few in number, indigenous groups still represented here are Nahuas and Otomis. There is also a community of Triques, who arrived here from Justrahuacan, Putla, Oaxaca and still speak the Trique language.

The municipality, founded in 1814, is bordered by the municipalities of Huehuetoca, Coyotepec, Cuautitlán Izcalli, Nicolás Romero, Teoloyucan and Villa del Carbón as well as the State of Hidalgo with a total area of 208.8 km^{2} (80.6 sq mi). The municipality varies in altitude from 2,250 to 2,900 meters (7,380 to 9,510 ft) above sea level. The municipality has a mostly temperate climate with most rain falling in the summer and freezing temperatures common in the winter months. Predominant winds are from the northeast. 91% of the municipality is rural with about 9% developed. Much of the rural area is the Sierra de Tepotzotlán mountain range, which extends into neighboring Huehuetoca. There are two rivers here, the Hondo de Tepotzotlán and the Lanzarote, with a number of fresh-water springs and streams. There is one large dam called La Concepción along with a number of small ones, which are primarily used for the raising of fish.

Most of the rural land consists of forest (47%) with agriculture and fish production next at about 20% each. Agriculture and fish farming account for over 40% of the economic activity of this municipality. Industry is a growing part of the economic base, with over ninety factories dedicated to the production of metals, processed meats, car parts, textiles and dyes. In third place is tourism which is mostly limited to the town center, the Arcos de Sitio and the ecological park. Much of the valley here is still dedicated to agriculture but this is being replaced by urbanization. Much of this urbanization is in the way of industrial parks, such as the Parque Industrial El Convento I and the Parque Industrial FRISA San Jose, which is of recent construction. Both are located very close to the Mexico City-Querétaro highway. Another impetus to urbanization is the building of housing developments to handle the influx of people moving here from Mexico City.

=== Points of Interest ===
The Aqueduct of Xalpa, better known as the Arcos del Sitio is a monumental aqueduct that carried water from the Oro River to Tepozotlán. The aqueduct was built between the 18th and 19th centuries. It was begun by the Jesuits to bring water to their monastery and college but it was not finished because the Jesuits were expelled from Mexico in 1767. It would not be finished until the 19th century by Manuel Romero de Terreros. The site that gives the aqueduct the name "Arcos del Sitio" is the deep gorge through which it passes. Here the aqueduct reaches 61 meters (200 ft) in height, with four levels of arches. The total length of the aqueduct is 41,900 metres (137,500 ft; 41.9 km; 26.0 mi). It is the highest aqueduct in Latin America. This gorge is at the site of the old La Concepcíon Hacienda, which was one of many owned by the Jesuits. In 1780, it was acquired by Pedro Romero de Terreros and was in the family until 1980. In 1993, restoration work was begun, ending in 1997. It was a farming hacienda that provided much of the foodstuffs for the Jesuits. Today, the hacienda is open to the public by appointment and can host guests as well as special events. Also here is the Centro Ecoturístico y de Educación Ambiental. It is now home to the Centro Ecoturistico y de Educación Ambiental Arcos del Sitio. It contains 54 hectares (130 acres) and hosts sports such as hiking, mountain biking and camping. The area is filled with reptiles, amphibians and birds. Annually, about 750,000 visit this park.

The Parque Ecológico Xochitla is located three kilometers (1.9 mi) outside the city of Tepotzotlán, which used to be a hacienda known as La Resurrección. It is operated by the non-profit Xochitla Foundation. It is about 70 hectares (170 acres) of parkland with about 7,000 species of trees and other plants. It has workshops, playgrounds, expositions, a greenhouse and a lake with a wide variety of aquatic plants. It also contains a very large and very old ginkgo biloba tree from China.

The Sierra de Tepotzotlán state park comprises 13,175 hectares (32,560 acres) over the municipalities of Tepotzotlán and Huehuetoca. It was declared a state park and ecological preservation zone in 1977. However, since then much of the sierra has been decommissioned as a park to create the Military Base 37C. The sierra contains forests of holm oak, strawberry trees and kermes oak, with areas of scrub and meadows. In the low-lying areas cactus and agave can be found. Along the river that runs through here are ash trees, trees of heaven, willows and others. Wildlife consists of small mammals such as coyotes and squirrels as well as a large number of birds and reptiles. Sports that can be practiced here included hiking, camping, swimming, rock climbing and rappelling.

== See also ==
- College of San Francisco Javier
- Camino Real de Tierra Adentro
