= Xochitla =

Ecological park in Tepotzotlán, Mexico

Xochitla (place of flowers) is an ecological park in Tepotzotlán, State of Mexico, Greater Mexico City that promotes environment care through various activities planned by the park.
