= Victoria del Bicentenario =

Sculpture in Puerto Vallarta, Jalisco, Mexico

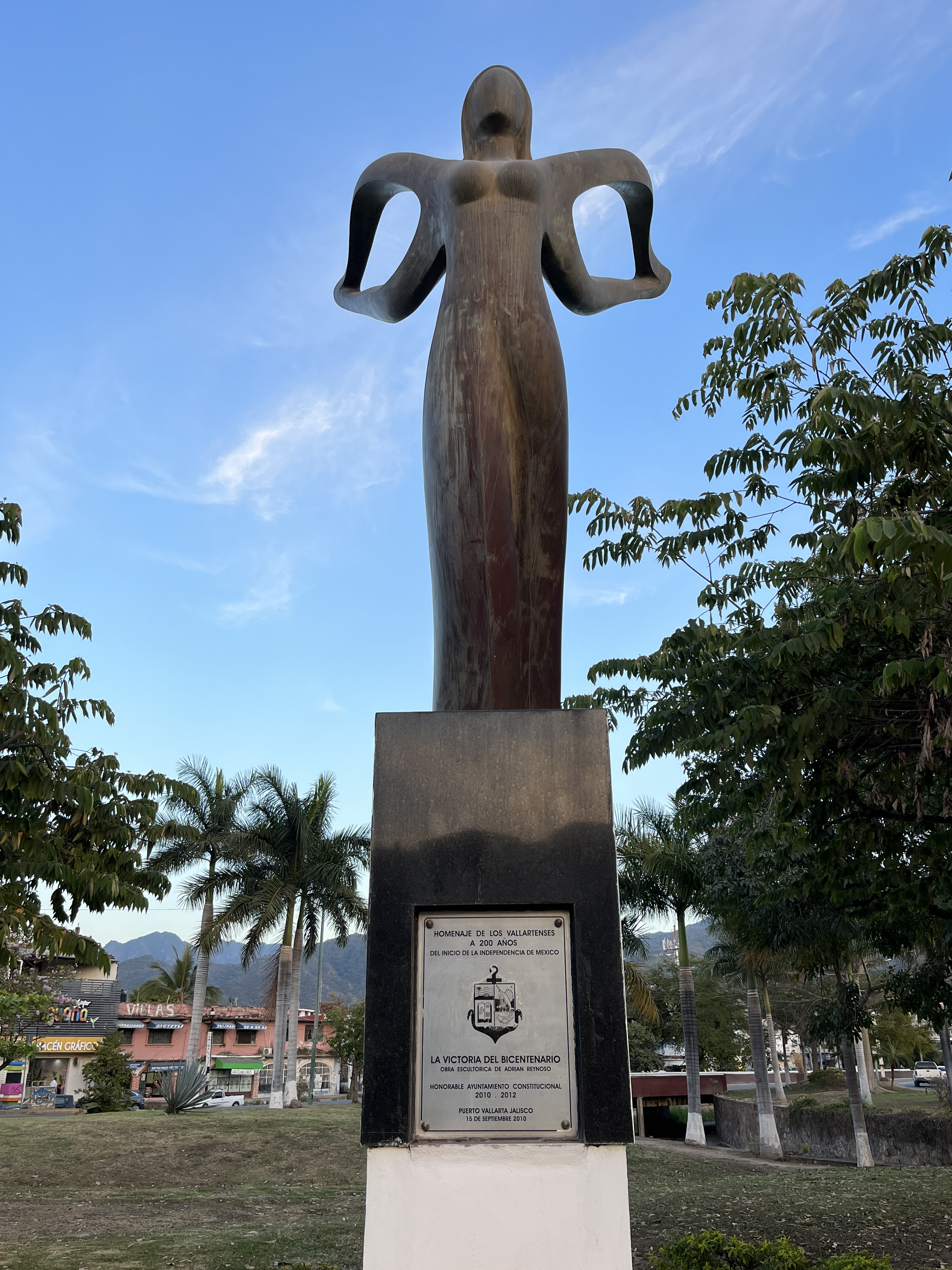
- The sculpture in 2023
- Artist: Adrián Reynoso
- Location: Puerto Vallarta, Jalisco, Mexico
- 20°37′52.3″N 105°13′43.7″W

Victoria del Bicentenario (English: Bicentennial Victory) is a sculpture by Adrián Reynoso, installed in Puerto Vallarta's Parque de las Mujeres, in the Mexican state of Jalisco.

== Description ==
The sculpture is installed at Francisco Medina Ascencio Avenue and Luis Donaldo Colosio Street. It depicts a "stylized angel that symbolizes the freedom obtained by the struggle that began on September 16, 1810". A plaque reads: Homage to the Vallartans two hundred years from the beginning of the Mexican Independence movement. / "La Victoria del Bicentenario”, sculptural work by Adrián Reynoso. / Honorable Constitutional City Council 2010-2012. / September 15, 2010.

== History ==
The artwork was unveiled on September 10, 2010.
