= Parque de las Mujeres =

Park in Puerto Vallarta, Jalisco, Mexico

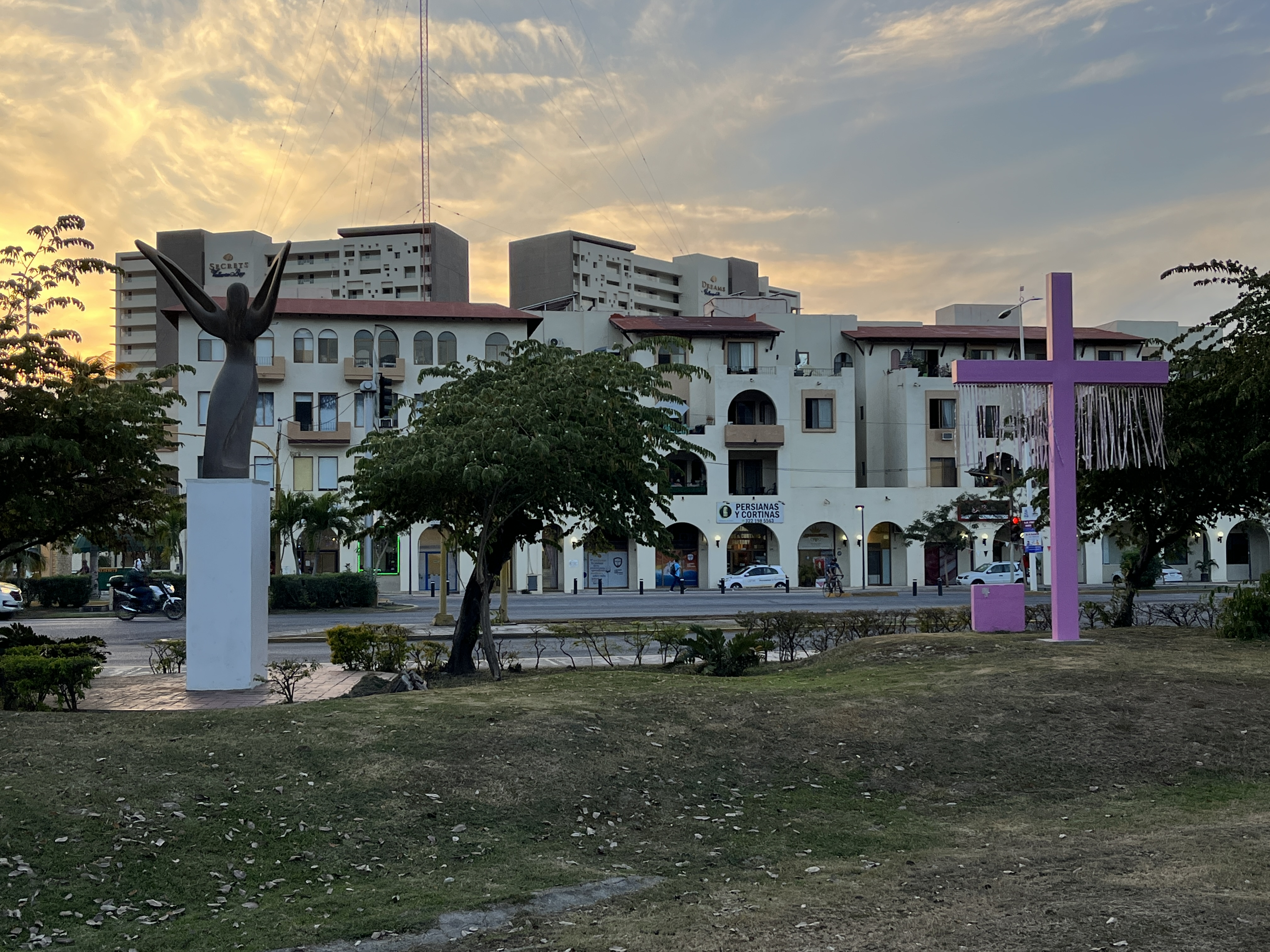
- The park in 2023
- Interactive map of Parque de las Mujeres
- Location: Puerto Vallarta, Jalisco, Mexico
- Coordinates: 20°37′52.5″N 105°13′43″W

Parque de las Mujeres is a park in Olímpica, Puerto Vallarta, in the Mexican state of Jalisco. The park features a memorial to victims of femicide.

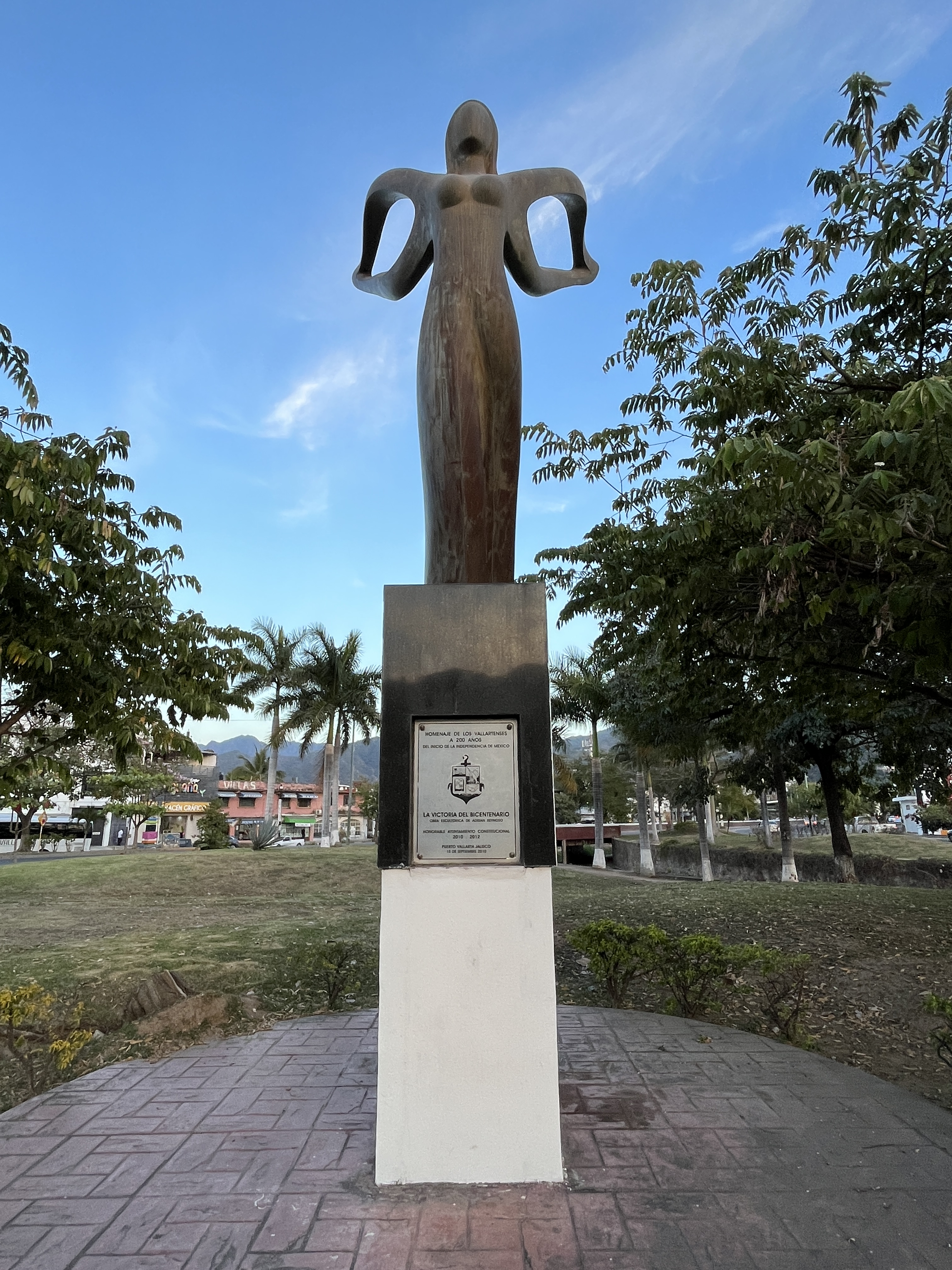
Victoria del Bicentenario

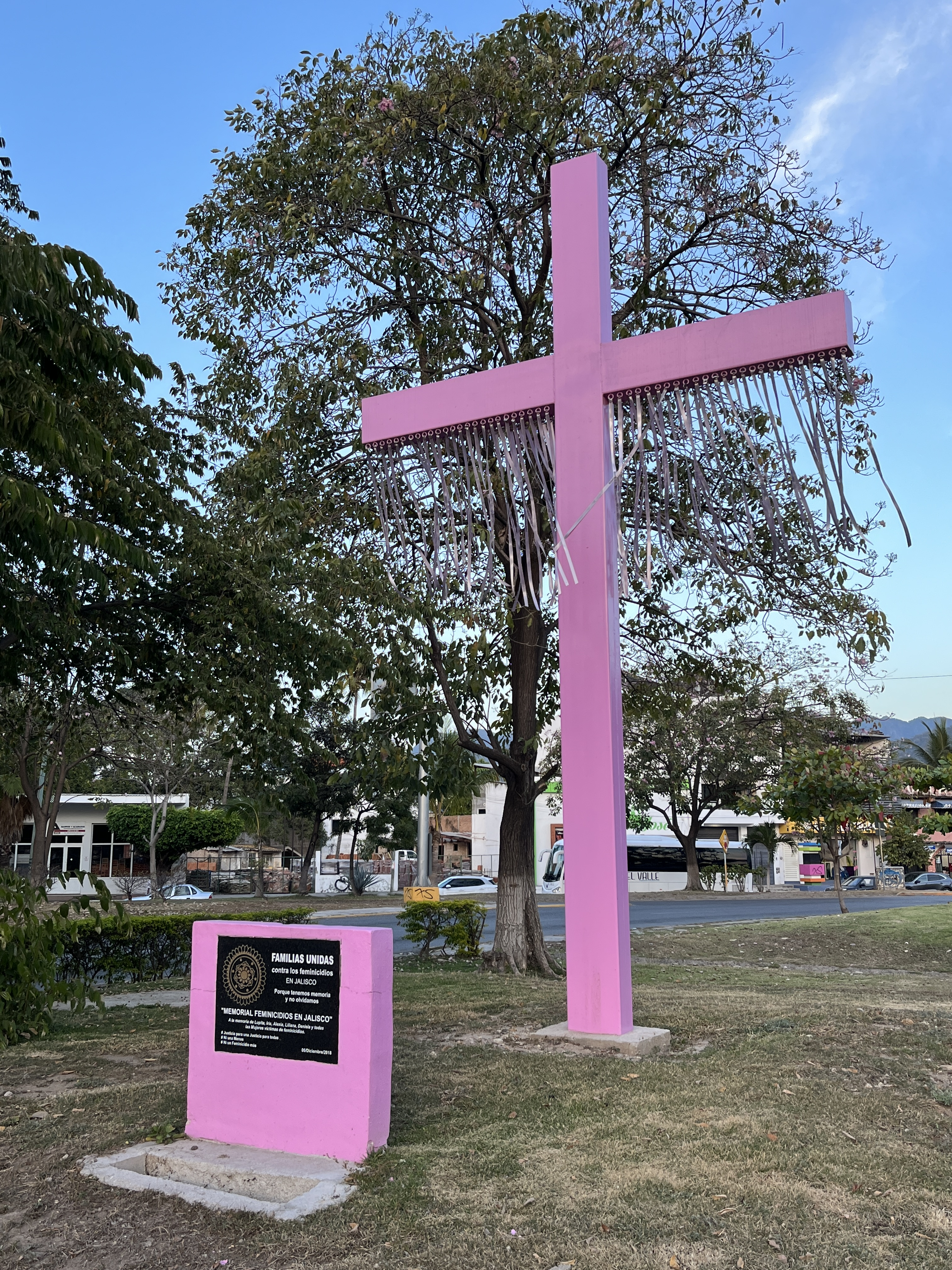
Memorial
