= Fountain of Neptune =

The Fountain of Neptune (Italian: Fontana del Nettuno) is the name of several fountains in the world:

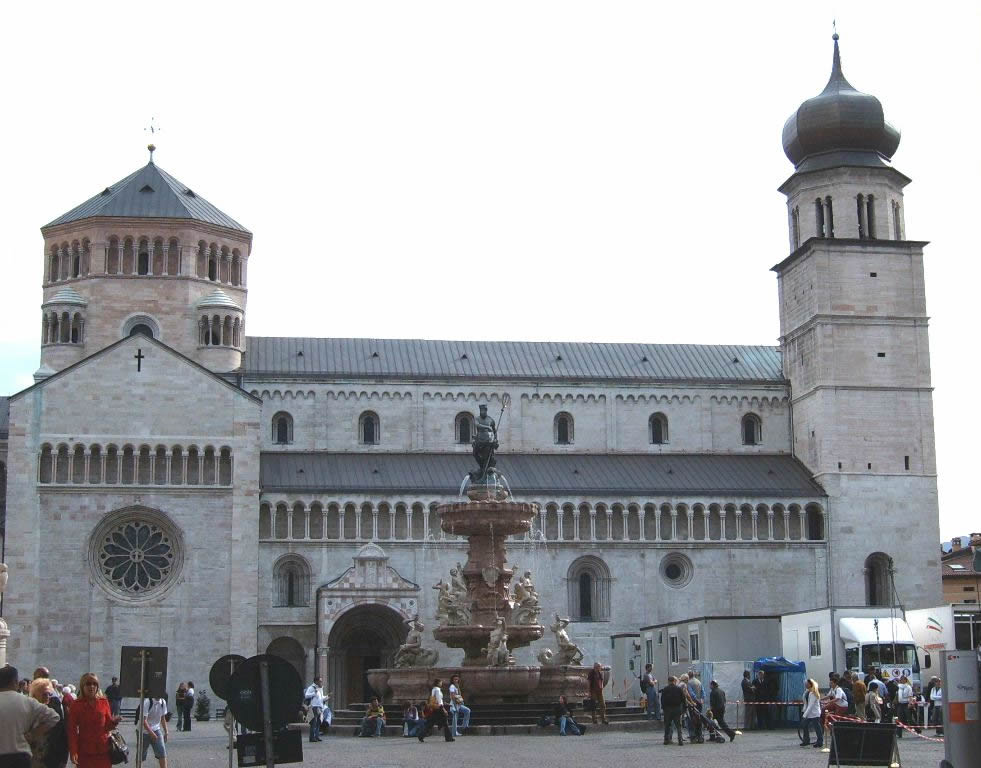
Trento Cathedral with the Fountain of Neptune.

- Neptunbrunnen (Neptune fountain) in Berlin, Germany.
- Neptunbrunnen (Neptune fountain) in Munich, Germany.
- Fountain of Neptune, Bologna, by Giambologna
- Fountain of Neptune, Florence, by Bartolommeo Ammanati located in the central Piazza della Signoria
- Fountain of Neptune, Naples
- Fountain of Neptune, Madrid
- Fountain of Neptune, Mexico City
- Fountain of Neptune, Rome, located in Piazza Navona (another is in Piazza del Popolo)
- Court of Neptune Fountain, Washington, D.C.
- Neptune's Fountain, Gdańsk
- Trevi Fountain, Rome features Neptune in central Exedrae
- Fountain of Neptune, Messina, by Giovanni Angelo Montorsoli
- Fountain of Neptune, Santiago de Chile
- Fountain of Neptune, Trento
- Fountain of Neptune, located on the Schönbrunn Palace grounds, Vienna
