= Malgré Tout =

Sculpture series

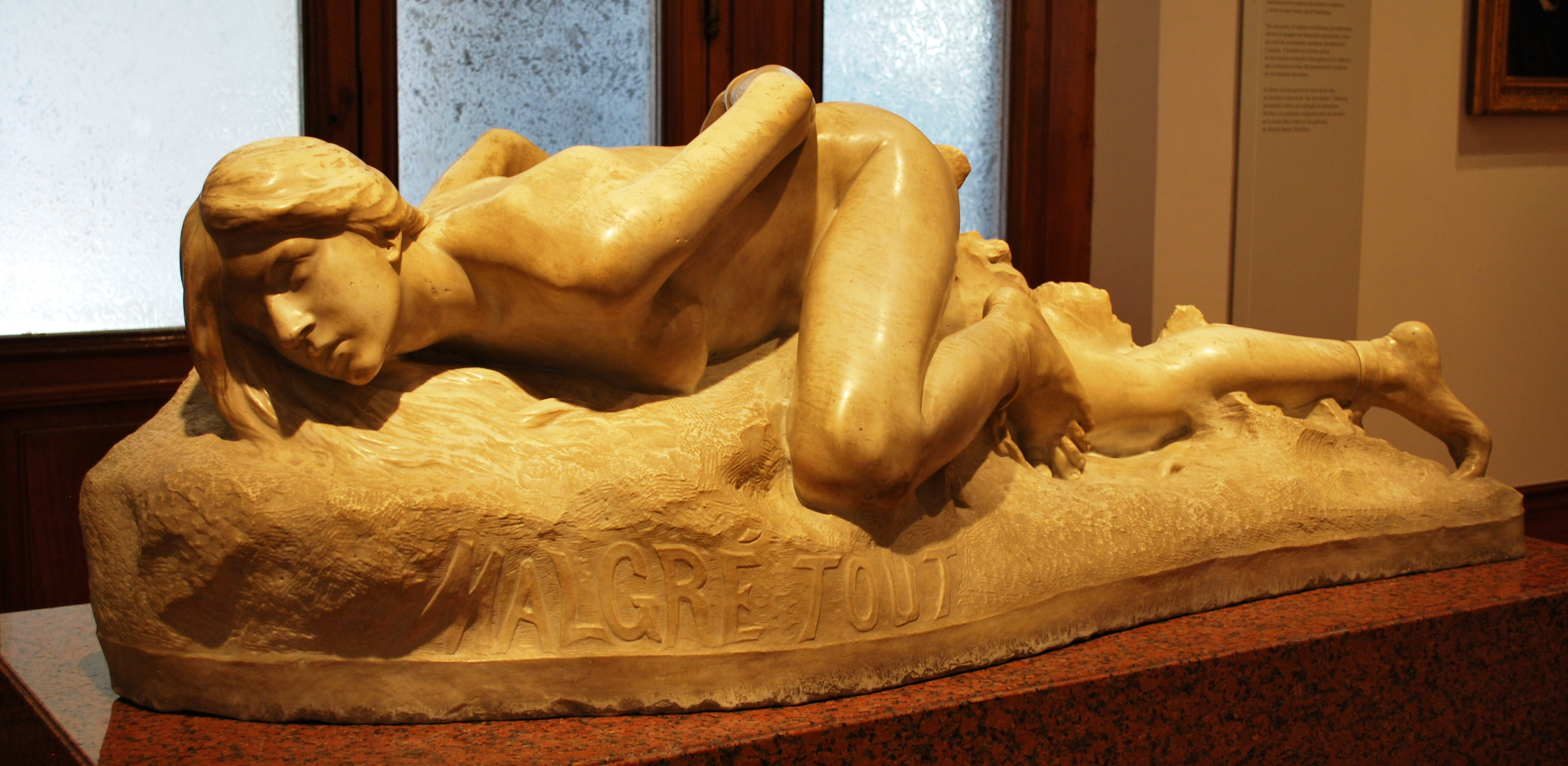
- The sculpture at the Museo Nacional de Arte, 2009
- Artist: Jesús Fructuoso Contreras

Malgré Tout is an 1898 sculpture by Jesús Fructuoso Contreras, depicting a nude woman lying down struggling against chains to rise.

There are copies in the Museo Nacional de Arte and the Alameda Central, in Mexico City, as well as the Aguascalientes Museum in Aguascalientes, Mexico.

The name "Malgré Tout" is French for "nevertheless" or "in spite of everything". The sculptor created it after losing his right arm.

== Museo Nacional de Arte ==
The Museo Nacional de Arte has a marble version.

== Alameda Central ==
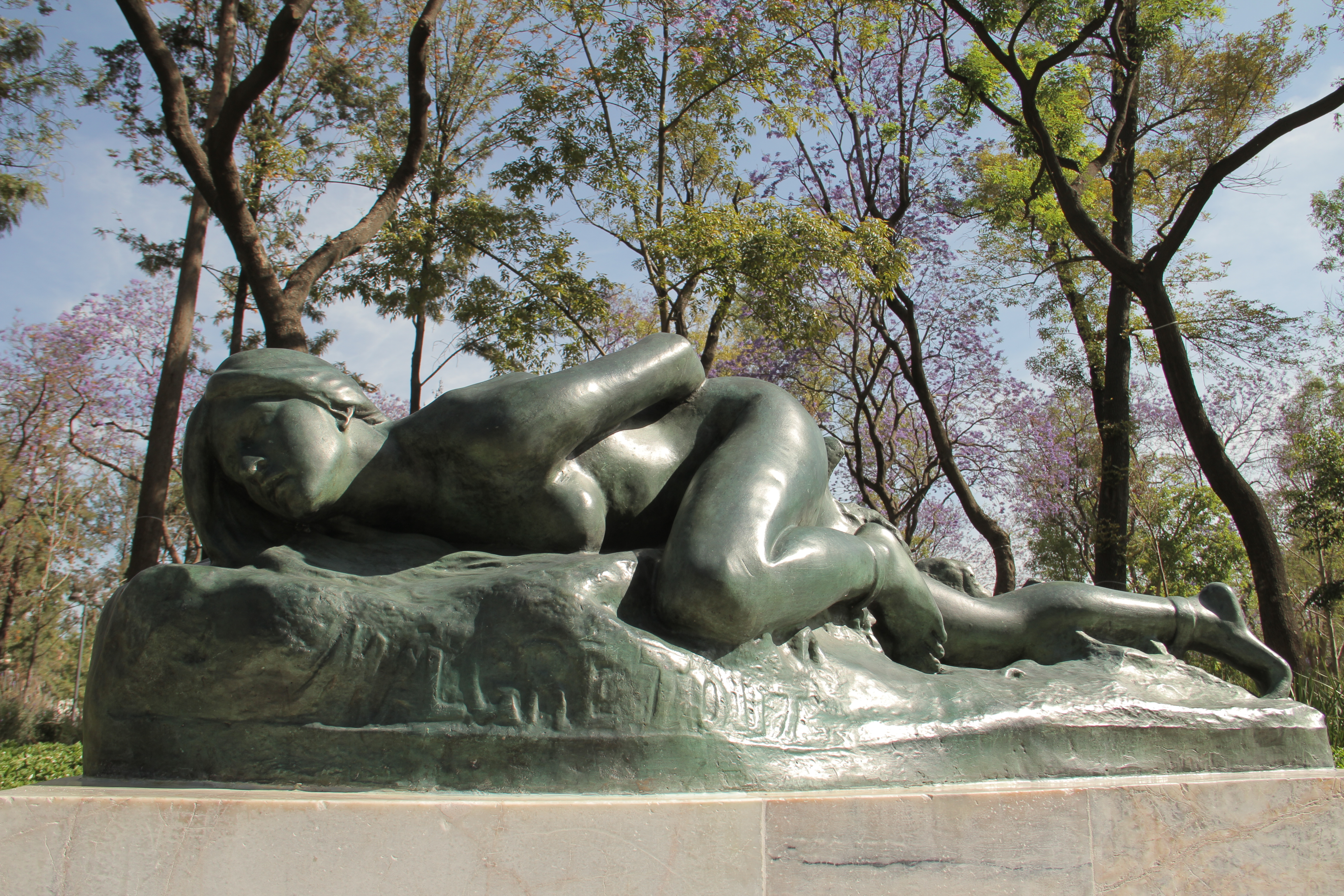
The sculpture in Alameda Central, 2013

Alameda Central has a copy of the sculpture. Contreras' statue Désespoir is also displayed in the park. This was where the original marble sculpture was first displayed before it was moved to the museum.

== Museo Aguascalientes ==
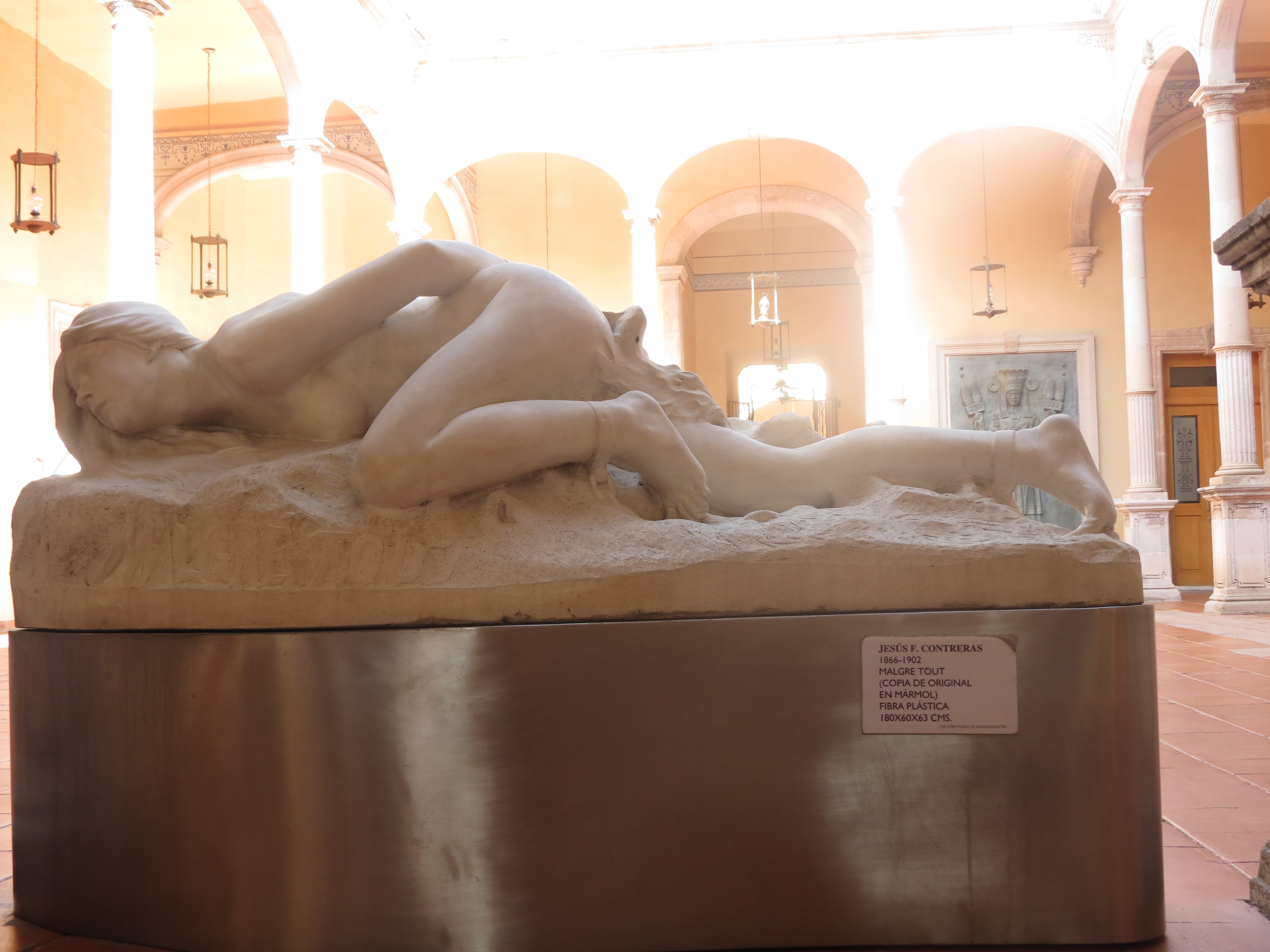
Replica in the Aguascalientes Museum, 2012

The Aguascalientes Museum also has a copy of the sculpture.
