= Theodor von Gosen =

German sculptor

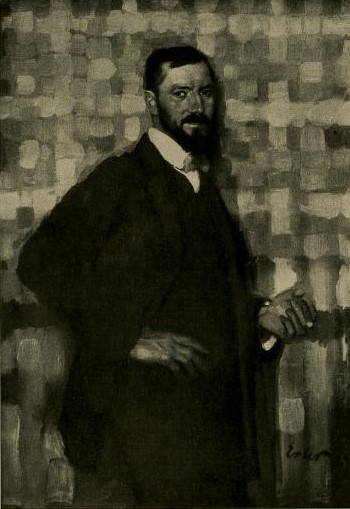
- Born: 10 January 1873; Augsburg, Germany
- Died: 30 January 1943 (aged 70); Wrocław, Poland
- Occupation: Sculptor

Theodor von Gosen (10 January 1873 – 30 January 1943) was a German sculptor. His work was part of the art competitions at the 1928 Summer Olympics and the 1932 Summer Olympics. Gosen designed the Beethoven Monument in Alameda Central, Mexico City; it was installed in 1921.

He was appointed to the Kunstschule Breslau (Polish: Wrocław) in 1905.

== See also ==
- Amor on Pegasus, a 1914 sculpture in Wrocław, Poland.
