= Neptunbrunnen =

Neptunbrunnen (German for 'Neptune Fountain') may refer to:

- Neptunbrunnen (Berlin)
- Neptunbrunnen (Munich)
