= Gladiador romano =

Sculpture in Mexico City, Mexico

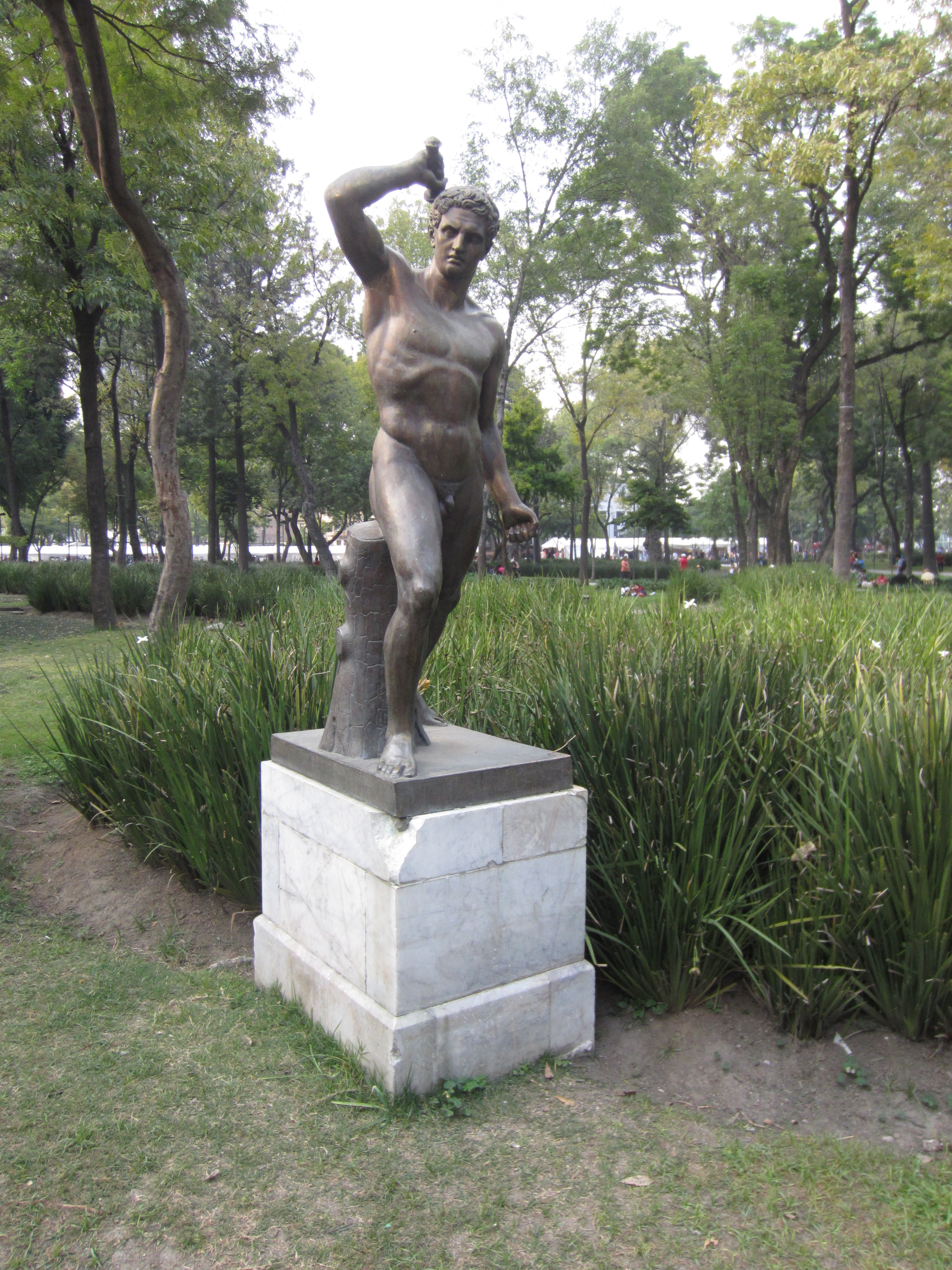
- The bronze copy in Mexico City's Alameda Central in 2018
- Artist: José María Labastida
- Completion date: c. 1830
- Dimensions: 201 cm × 89.5 cm × 86 cm (79.13 in × 35.24 in × 33.86 in)

Gladiador romano (English: Roman Gladiator) is a sculpture by José María Labastida. The Museo Nacional de Arte in Mexico City has a marble version, and a bronze copy is installed in Alameda Central.

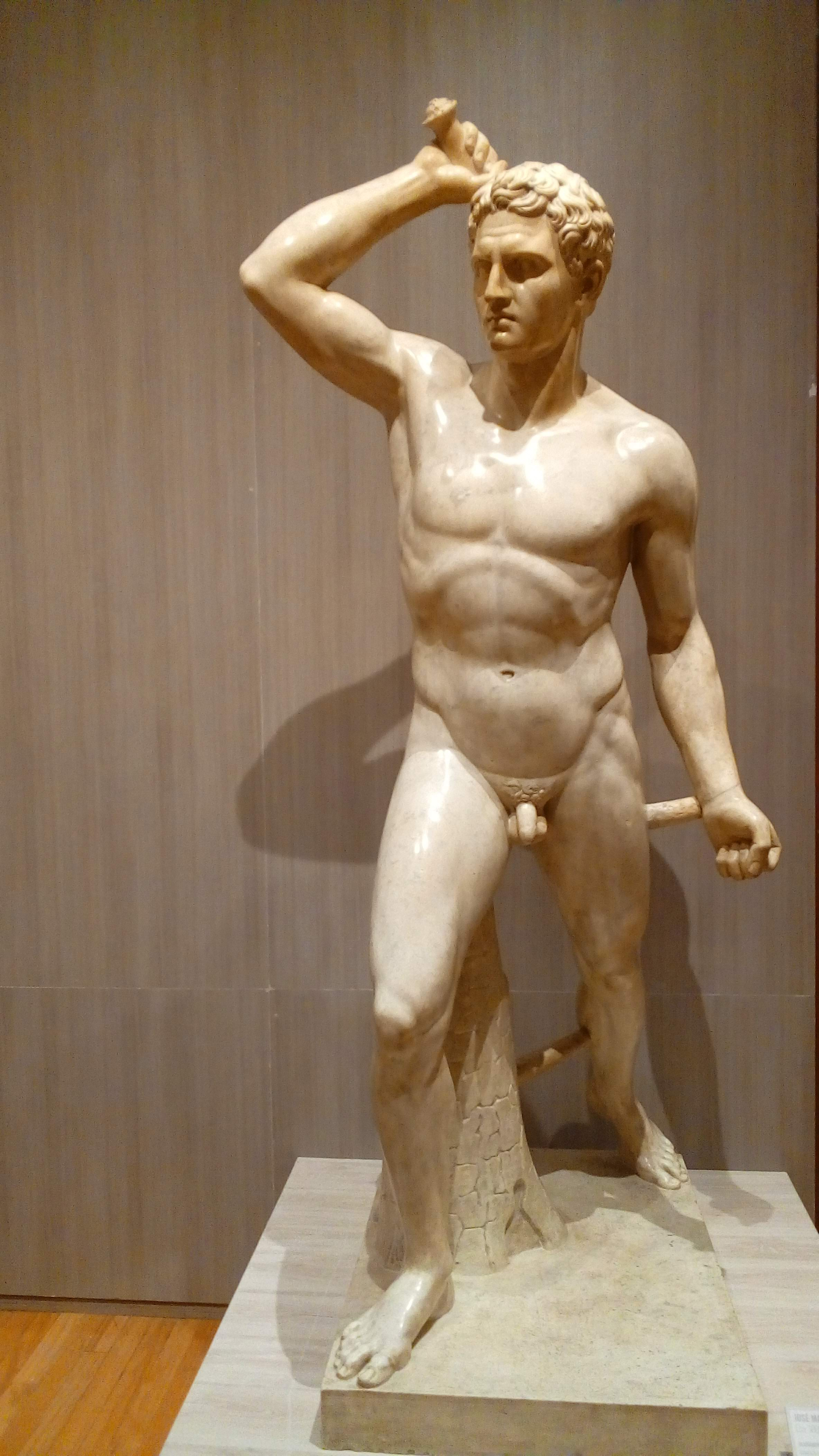
Original, Museo Nacional de Arte
