= Beethoven Monument (Mexico City) =

Sculpture in Mexico City, Mexico

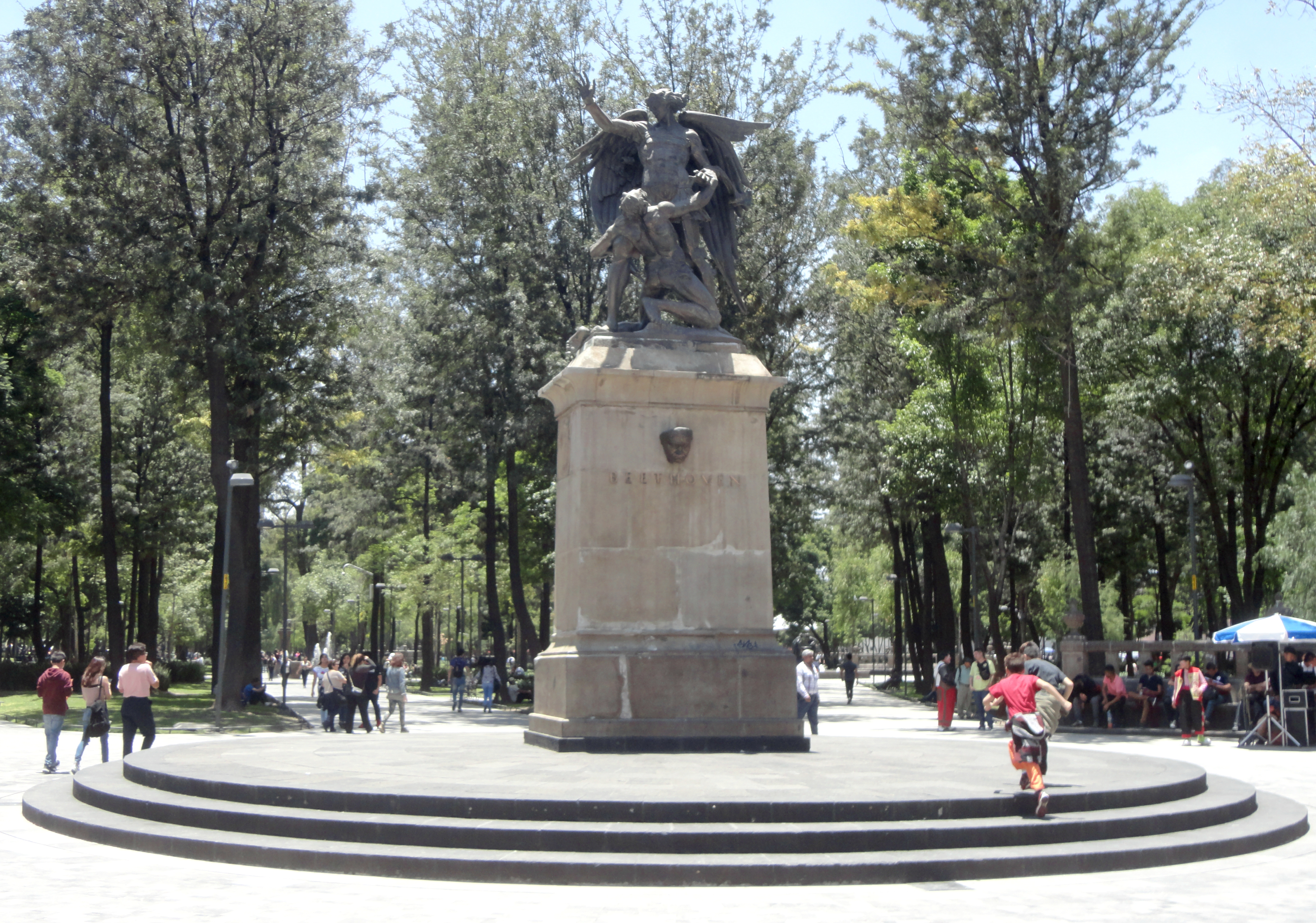
- The monument in 2013
- Location: Mexico City, Mexico
- Coordinates: 19°26′7.48″N 99°8′31.9″W

The Beethoven Monument (Spanish: Monumento a Beethoven) is installed in Alameda Central, Mexico City, Mexico. The memorial, designed by Theodor von Gosen, features two allegorical bronze sculptures, and was installed in 1921.
