= Fountain of Virgin =

Fountain and sculpture in Mexico City, Mexico

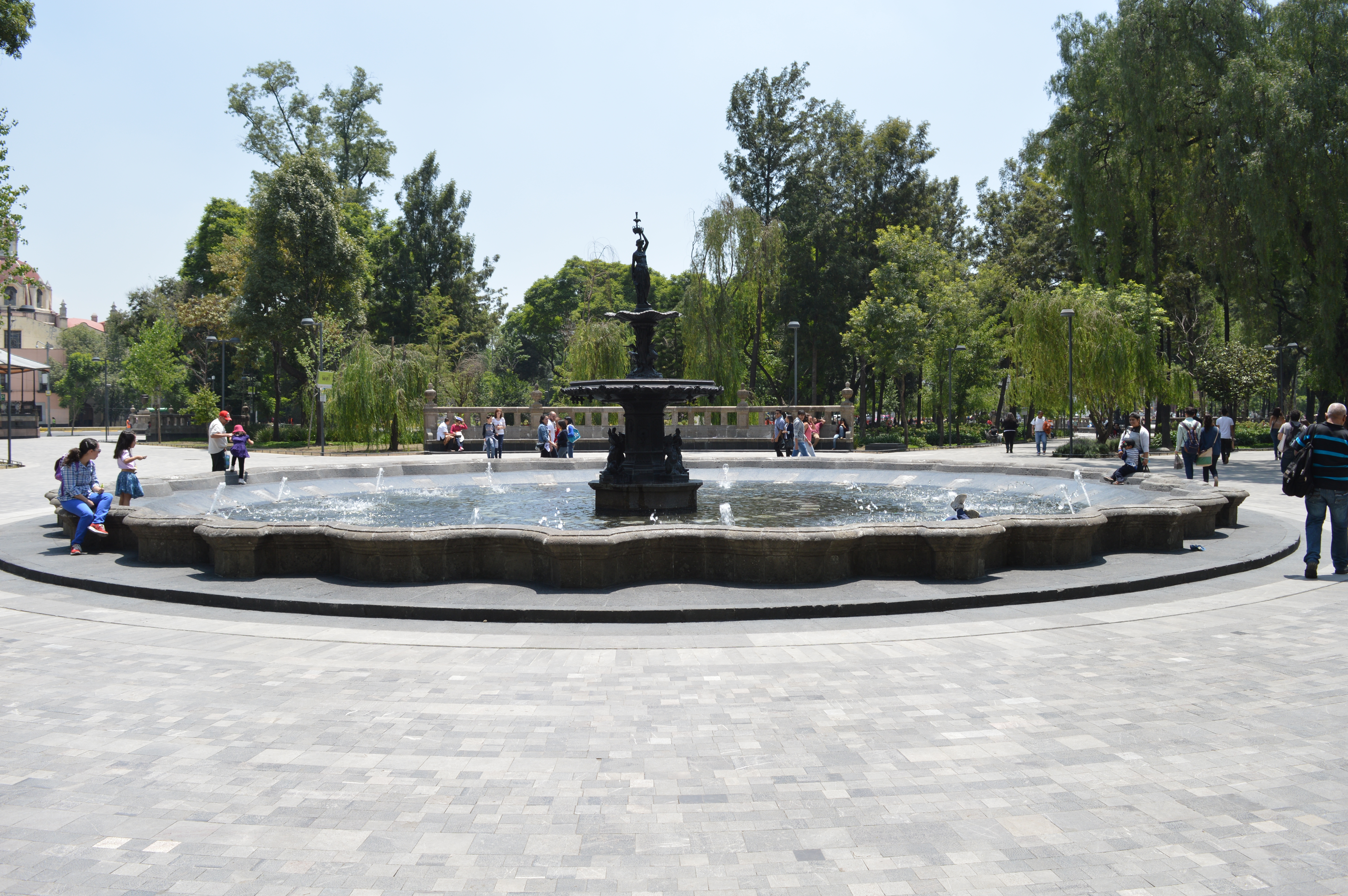
- The fountain in 2015
- Location: Mexico City, Mexico; 19°26′8.7″N 99°8′38.3″W

The Fountain of Virgin is installed in Mexico City's Alameda Central, in Mexico.
