= La Primavera (sculpture) =

Fountain and sculpture in Mexico City, Mexico

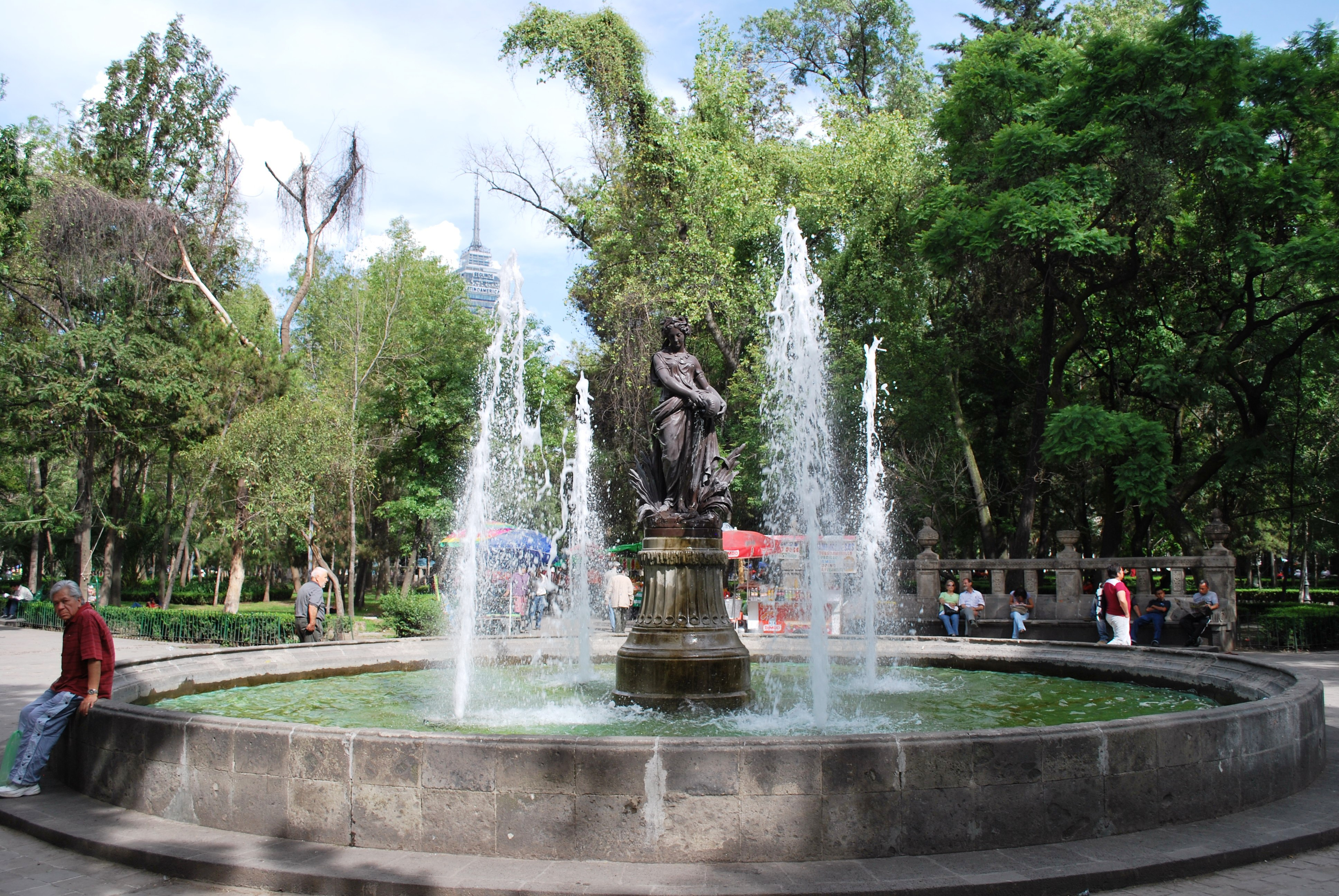
- The fountain in 2009
- Subject: Persephone
- Location: Mexico City, Mexico
- 19.4362°N 99.1448°W

La Primavera is an outdoor fountain and sculpture installed in Mexico City's Alameda Central, in Mexico. The statue represents Persephone.
