= Fountain of Venus =

Fountain and sculpture in Mexico City

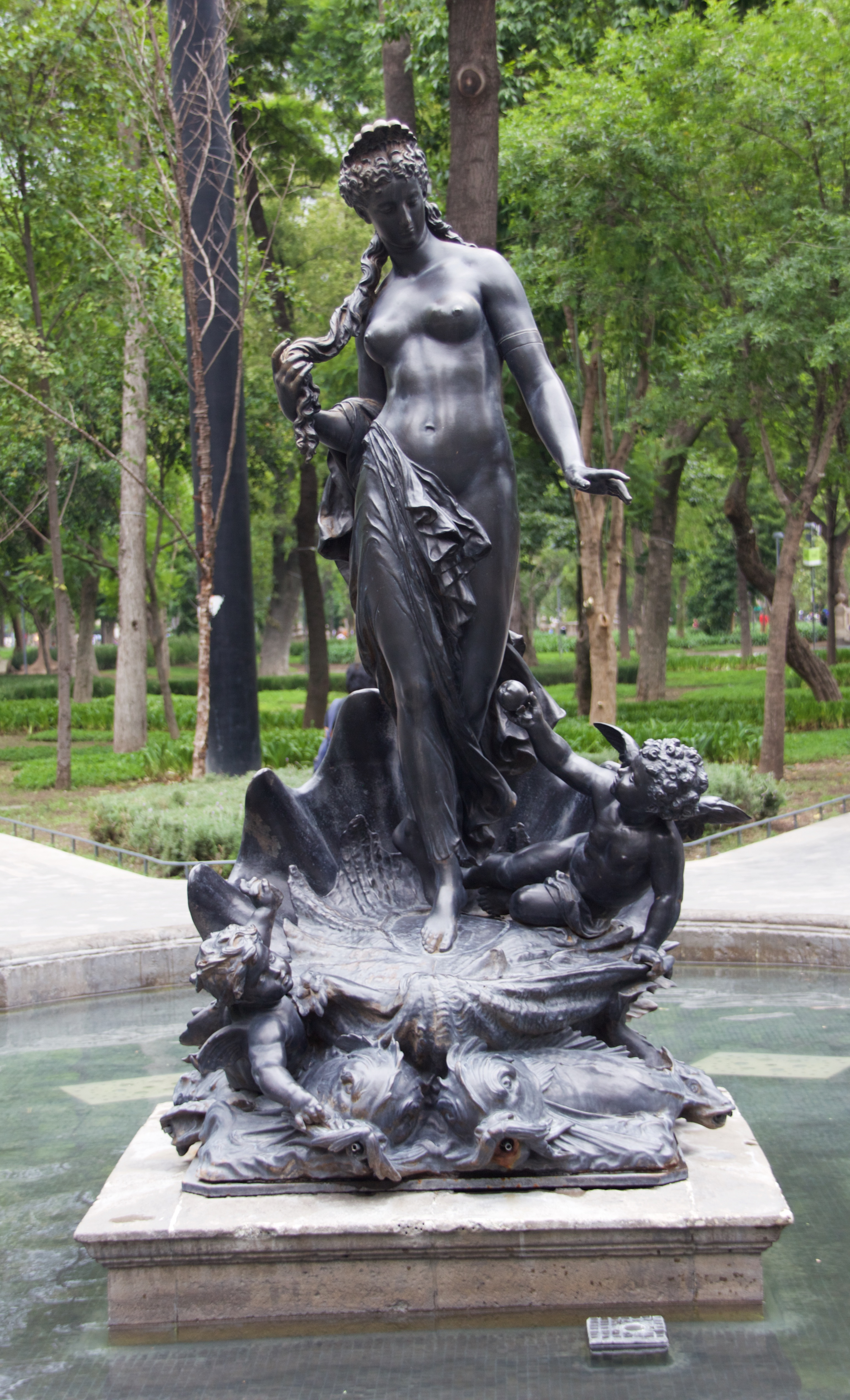
- The fountain in 2015
- Location: Mexico City, Mexico; 19°26′6.8″N 99°8′35.1″W

The Fountain of Venus (Spanish: Fuente de Venus) is a fountain featuring a statue of the Roman goddess Venus in Mexico City's Alameda Central, in Mexico.

It was gifted to Maximilian in 1866 by its sculptor, Mathurin Moreau. An identical statue is placed in the town of Limoux, France.
