= Benito Juárez Hemicycle =

Monument in Mexico City, Mexico

Coordinates: 19.4350°N 99.1442°W

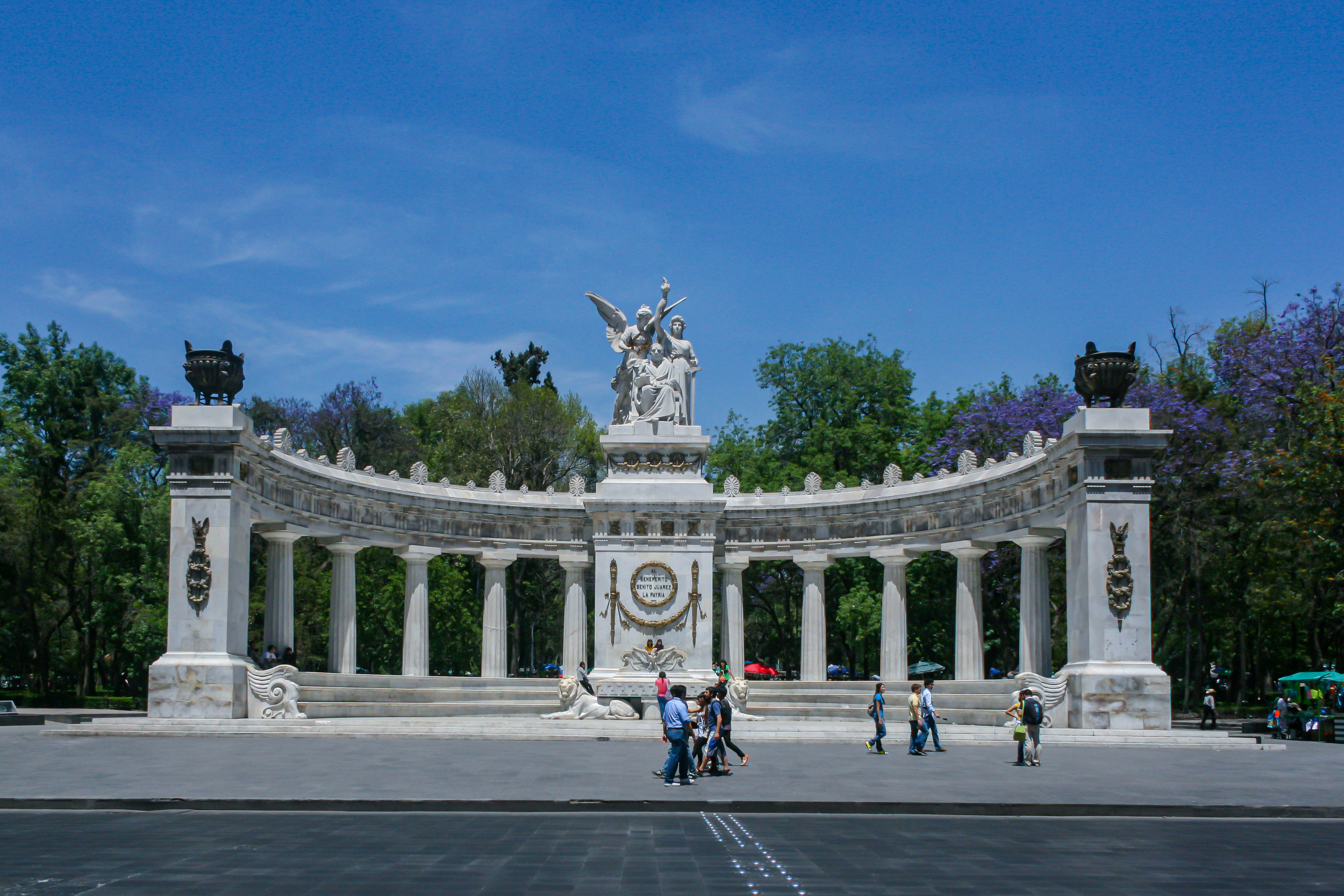
- The monument in 2010
- Location
- Location: Alameda Central park, Mexico City, Mexico
- Designer: Guillermo Heredia
- Type: Hemicycle
- Material: Marble
- Opening date: 1910
- Dedicated to: Benito Juárez

The Benito Juárez Hemicycle is a Neoclassical monument located at the Alameda Central park in Mexico City, Mexico and commemorating the Mexican statesman Benito Juárez. The statue of Juárez is flanked by marble Doric columns. There are two allegorical female statues next to Juárez, representing the fatherland and law. The pedestal bears the inscription "Al benemerito Benito Juárez la Patria" (Spanish: "To the meritorious Benito Juárez, the Homeland"). It was depicted on the reverse of the 20 peso bill of Series C and D, issued in 1994.

== History ==
The construction began in 1906 it mark the centennial of Juárez's birth. The engineers for the construction of the monument were assigned by Porfirio Díaz. Statues were sculpted by the Italian artist Alessandro Lazzerini.

The monument was dedicated on September 18, 1910.

== Style ==
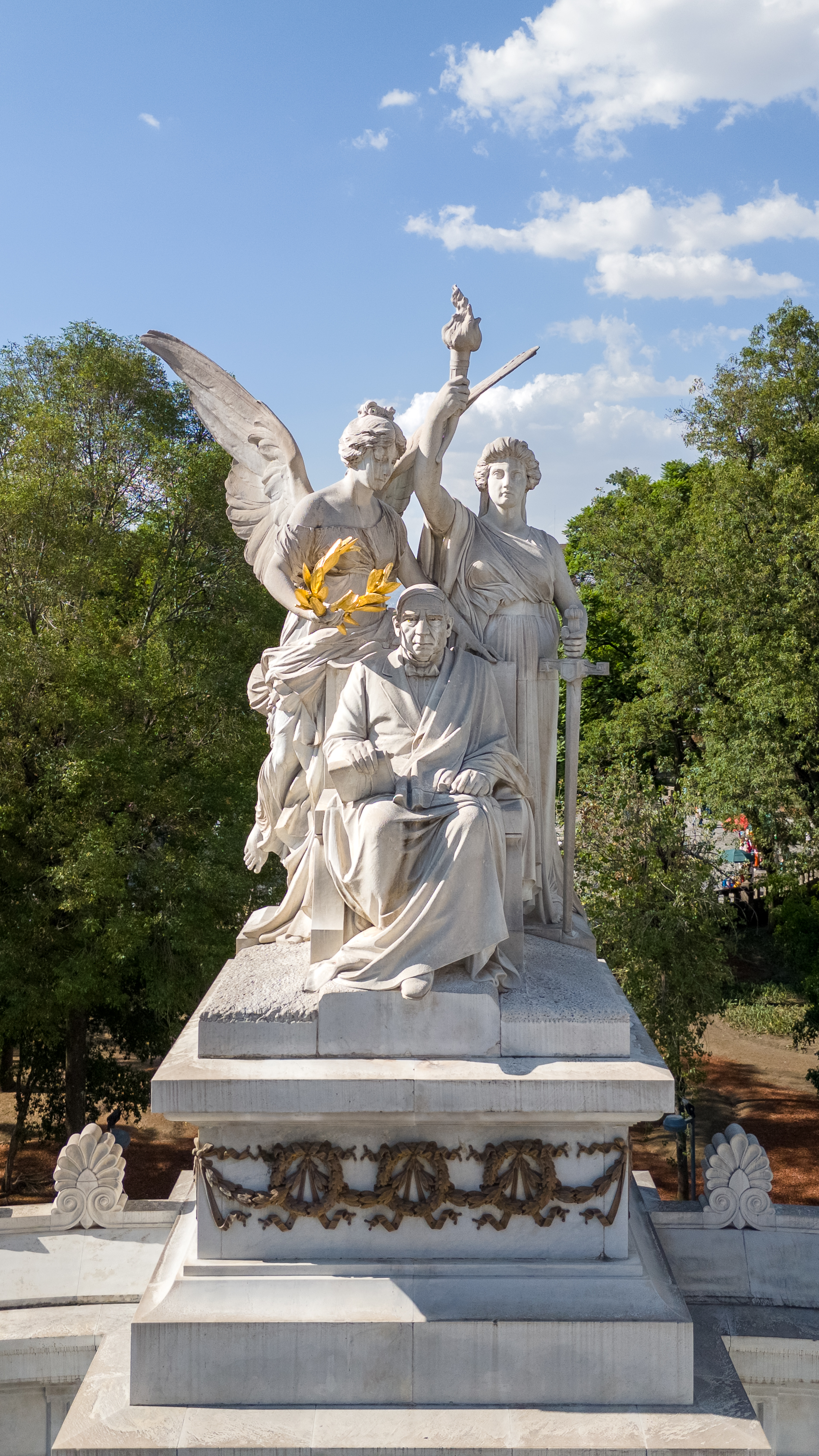
Sculptural group of the hemicycle.

It is Neoclassical style, semicircular, with strong Greek influence; it has twelve Doric columns, supporting an entablature and frieze structure of the same order. On both sides it has two golden spikes.

At the center is a sculpture composed of Benito Juarez seated with two allegories: one representing the homeland crowning Juarez with laurels in the presence of a second that represents the law in the basement has festoons, another sculpture center that chairs a republican eagle with open wings in a facing, with neoaztec frets, which lie two lions.

On the central pillar there is a medallion surrounded by a laurel, inscribed with the following;

"For the Meritorious Benito Juarez, the Homeland."
