= Cupid on the Pegasus =

Sculpture in Wrocław, Poland

Coordinates: 51°06′16″N 17°02′07″E

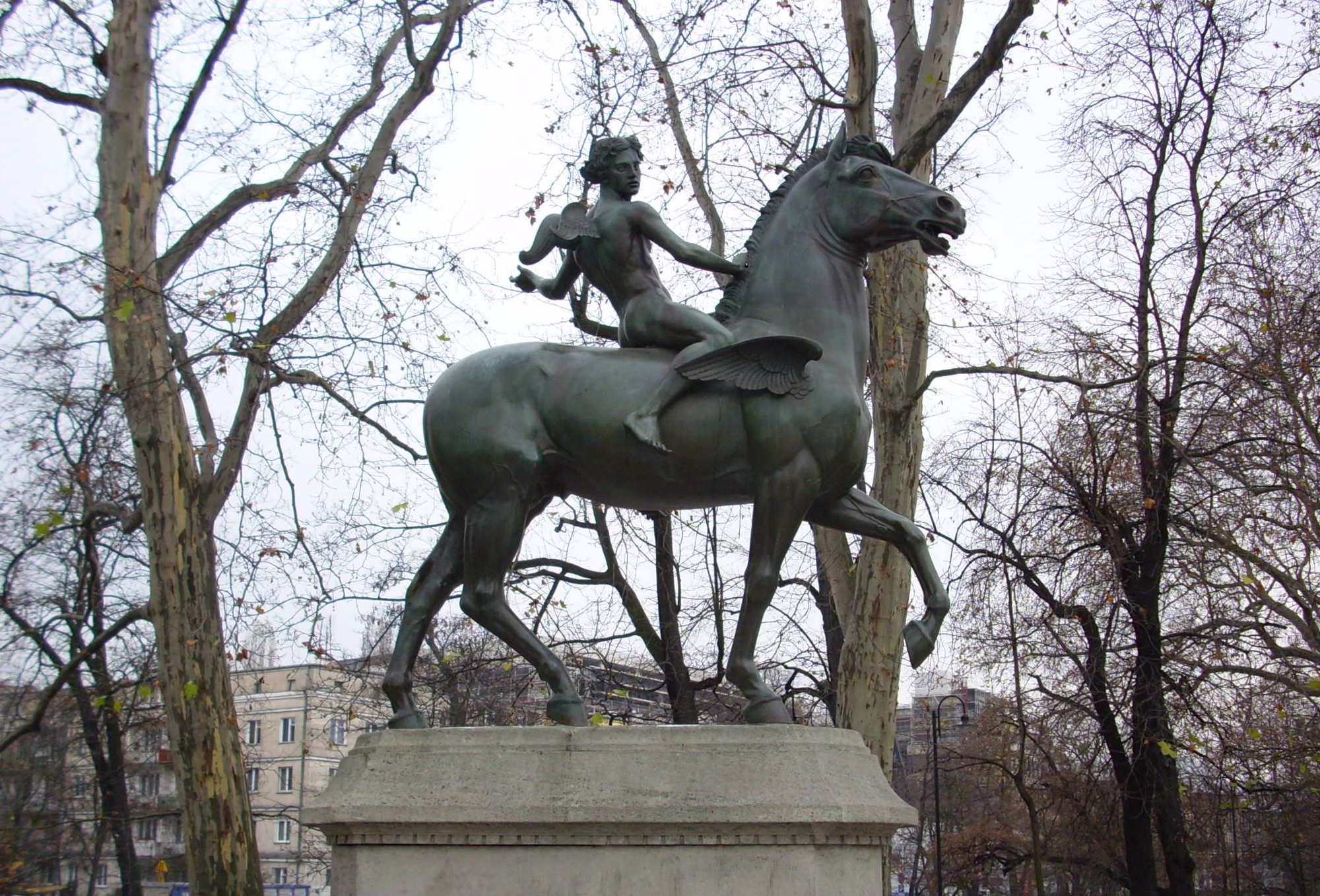
Cupid on the Pegasus, as seen in 2008

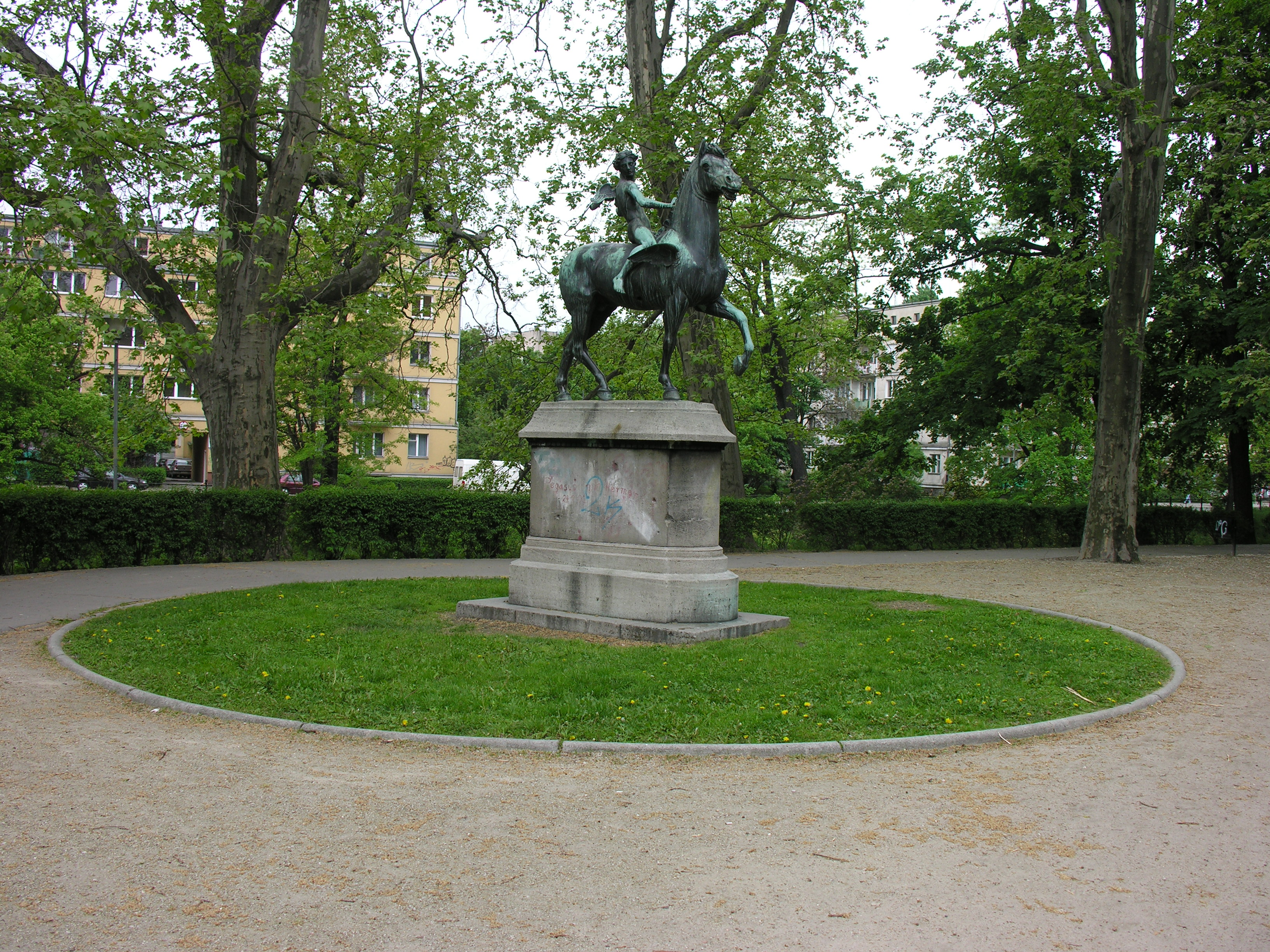
Copernicus Park setting.

The Cupid on the Pegasus monument (Polish: Pomnik Amora na Pegazie, German: Amor auf dem Pegasus reitend) in Wrocław, Poland, is a monument located in Nicolaus Copernicus Park (Park Mikołaja Kopernika we Wrocławiu), within the Old Town Promenade at Teatralna Street. The sculptor was Theodor von Gosen.

== Description ==
This monumental sculpture is set on a high pedestal that is located at the eastern end of the Park, at the back of the former Leipziger Palace. The cast-bronze sculpture is about 2 metres (6 ft 7 in) high and is set on a 2 metres (6 ft 7 in)-high limestone pedestal (rectangular horizontal section) with a cornice. The sculpture presents two mythical figures: Cupid riding on Pegasus, symbolizing love and poetry. Cupid's eyes are made of marble, and Pegasus' of topaz.

== History ==
The unveiling took place on 14 June 1914. Initially, it was placed in the Pavilion of the Association of Silesian Artists at the Centennial Exhibition organized in 1913 around the Centennial Hall. It was moved a year later to its present location.
