= Fountain of Mercury =

Fountain and sculpture in Mexico City

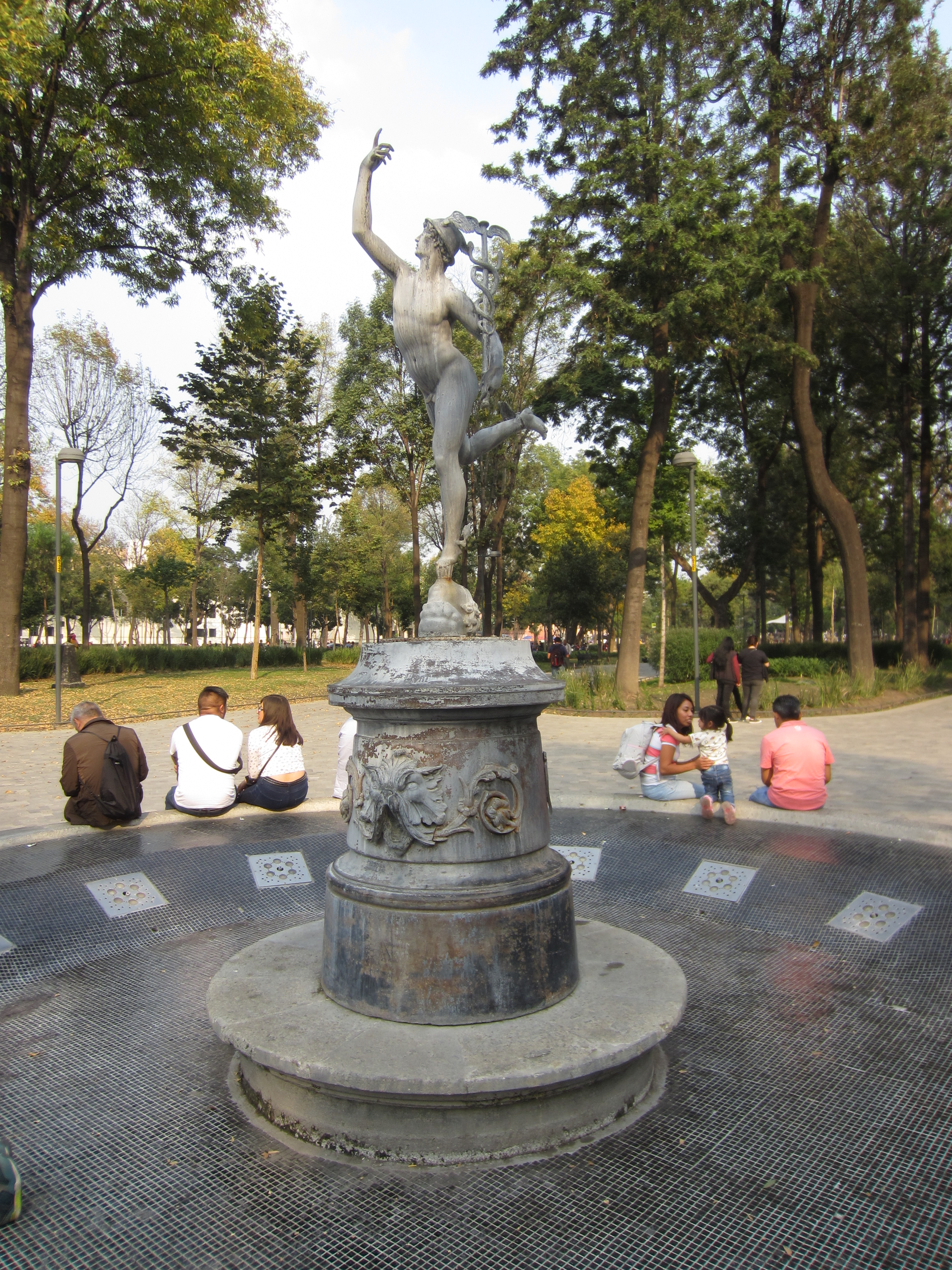
- The fountain and statue in 2018
- Location: Mexico City, Mexico; 19°26′9.8″N 99°8′45″W

The Fountain of Mercury is located in the Alameda Central in Mexico City, Mexico. The fountain's statue depicts Mercury.

== See also ==
- Mercury fountain
