= Gladiador frigio =

Sculpture in Mexico City, Mexico

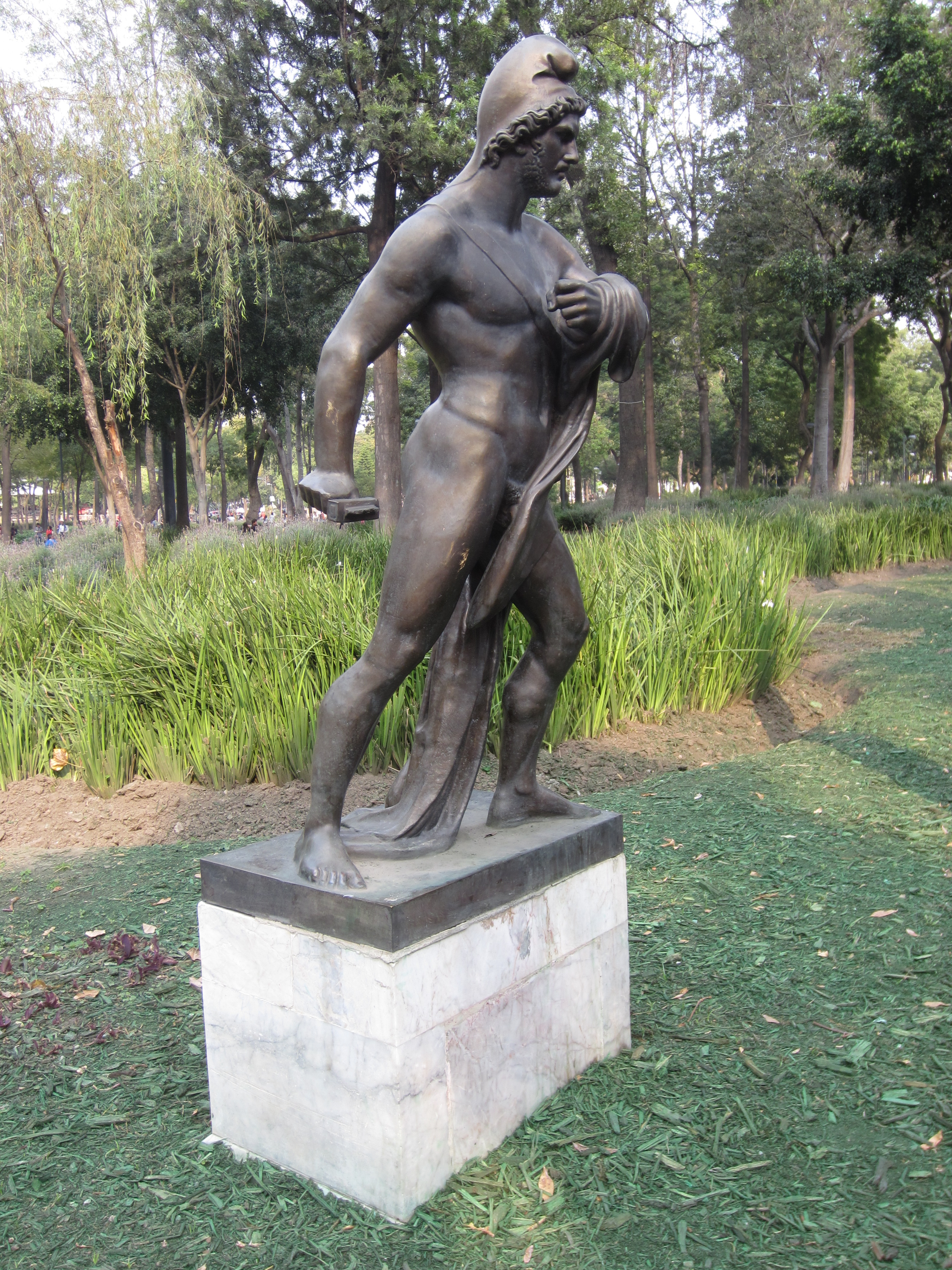
- The bronze copy in Mexico City's Alameda Central in 2018
- Artist: José María Labastida
- Completion date: 1830
- Dimensions: 190.5 cm × 77 cm × 81.1 cm (75 in × 30.31 in × 31.93 in)
- Location: Museo Nacional de Arte, Mexico City, Mexico

Gladiador frigio (English: Phrygian Gladiator) is a sculpture by José María Labastida. The Museo Nacional de Arte in Mexico City has a marble version, and a bronze copy is installed in Alameda Central.
