= Alameda Central =

Public park

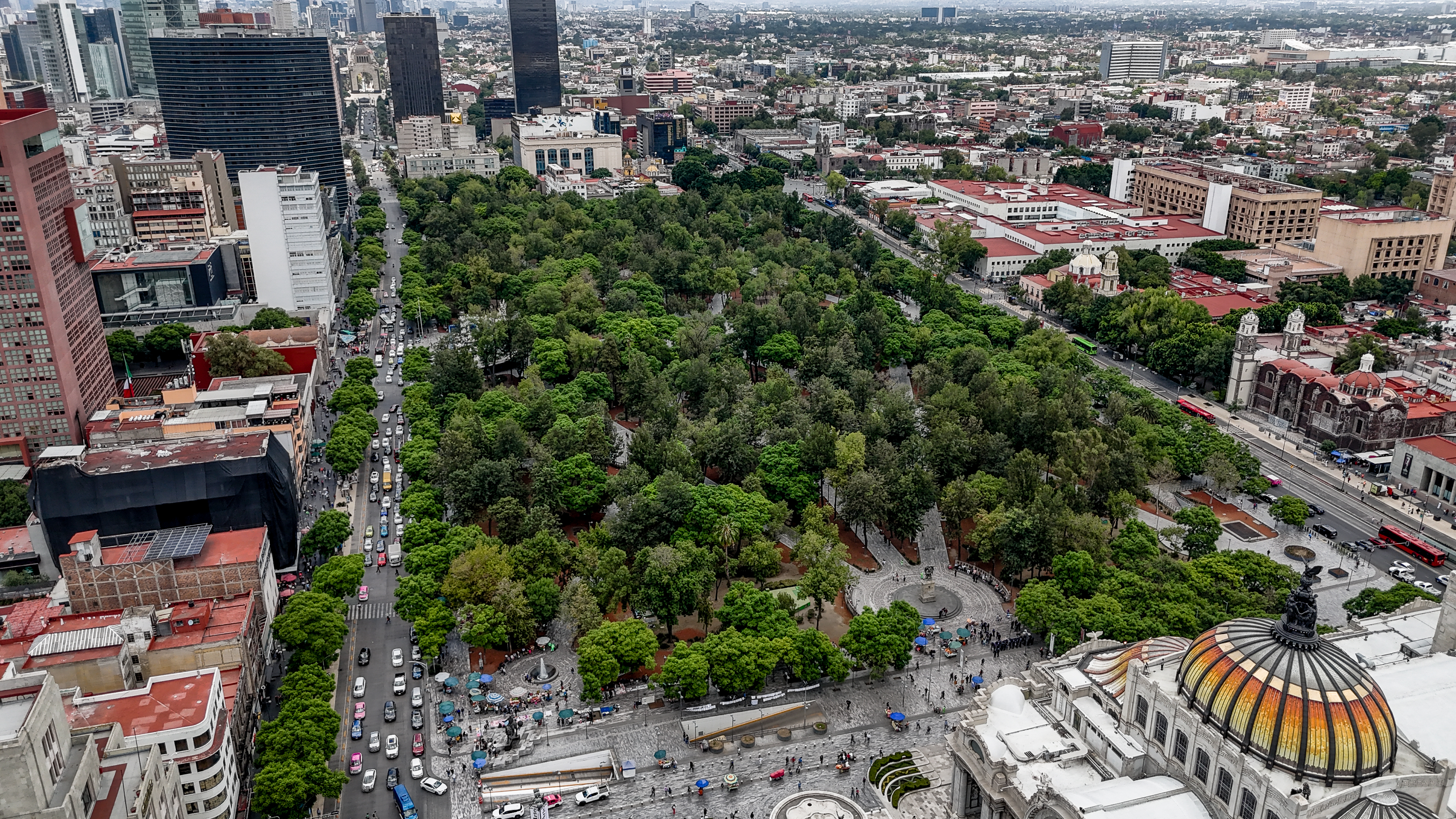
- Aerial shot of Alameda Central to the north-west

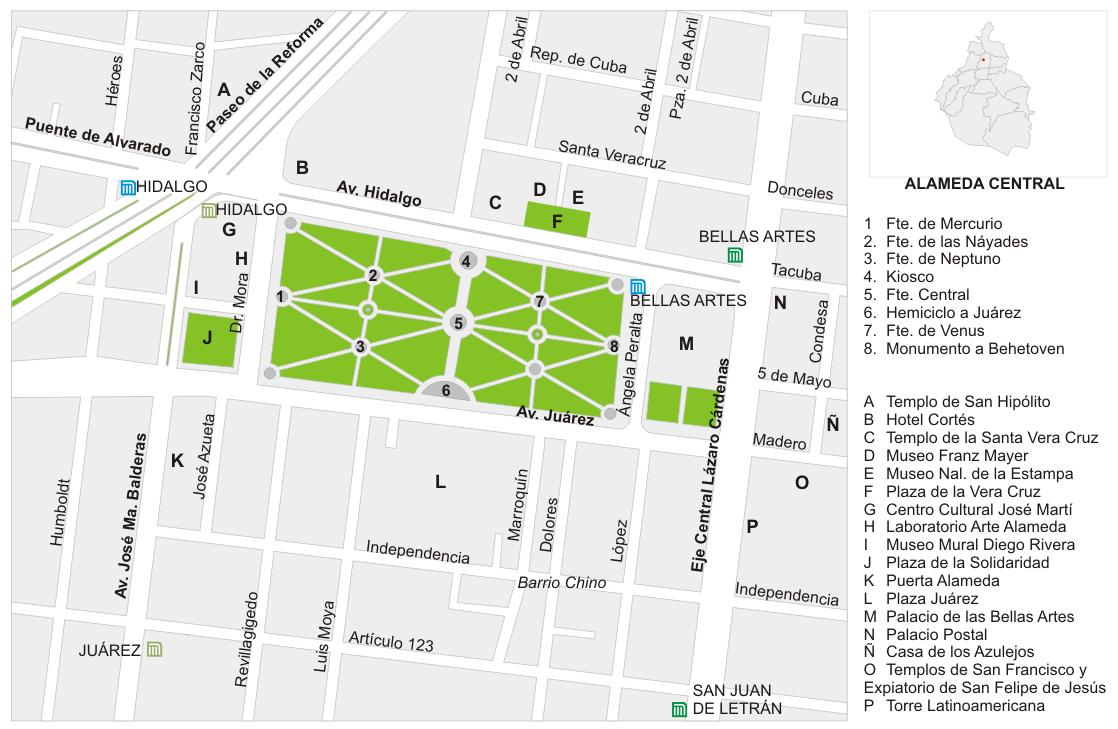
- Type: Urban park
- Location: Cuauhtémoc, Mexico City, Mexico
- Coordinates: 19°26′08″N 99°08′38″W

Alameda Central is a public urban park in downtown Mexico City. Established in 1592, Alameda Central is the oldest public park in the Americas. Located in Cuauhtémoc borough between Juárez Avenue and Hidalgo Avenue, the park is adjacent to the Palacio de Bellas Artes and can be accessed by Metro Bellas Artes.

== Description ==
The Alameda Central park is a green garden with paved paths and decorative fountains and statues, and is frequently the center of civic events. The area used to be an Aztec marketplace. On 11 January 1592, Viceroy Luis de Velasco II ordered the creation of a public green space for the city's residents. The name comes from the Spanish word álamo, which means poplar tree, that were planted here. This park was part of the viceroy's plan to develop what was, at that time, the western edge of the city. It has become a symbol of a traditional Mexican park and many other parks in the country take on the name "Alameda" as well.

=== Public art ===
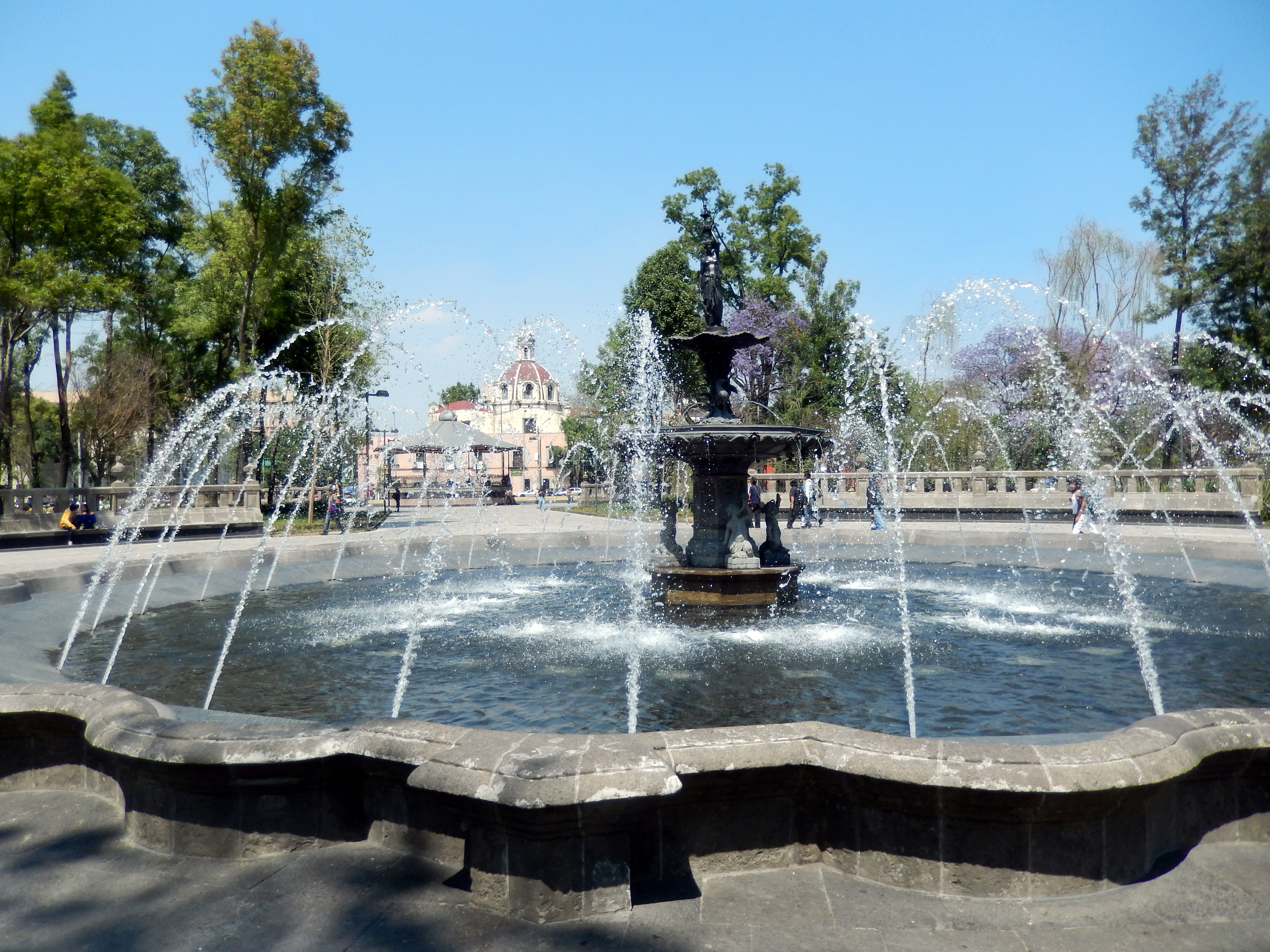
Central fountain of Parque Alameda

Fountains and statues in the park include:

- Beethoven Monument
- Benito Juárez Hemicycle
- Désespoire
- Fountain of Mercury
- Fountain of Neptune
- Fountain of Venus
- Fountain of Virgin (central fountain)
- Gladiador frigio
- Gladiador romano
- La Primavera
- Las Danaides
- Malgré Tout
- Statue of Alexander von Humboldt

== History ==
The original park was less than half the size of the current one, reaching only from where the Palacio de Bellas Artes is now to the location of the Hemiciclo de Juárez. What is now the western section of the park originally was a plain plaza built during the Inquisition in Mexico and known as El Quemadero (The Burning Place). Here witches and others convicted by the Inquisitors were publicly burned at the stake. By the 1760s, the Inquisition had nearly come to an end, and in 1770, viceroy Marqués de Croix had this plaza torn up to expand the park. The park was expanded again in 1791, when the Count of Revillagigedo built a wooden fence around the park to make it exclusive for the nobility. However, when Mexican Independence was won in 1821, the Alameda was the center of popular celebrations. In 1846, when President Santa Anna rode triumphantly into Mexico City, he ordered the fountains in the park be filled with alcohol.

The five classical fountains are of French design and inspired by Greco-Roman mythology. More statues were added to the park in the 19th century. Gas lamps were installed in 1868, which were replaced by electrical lighting 1892. By the end of the 19th century, the park had become popular with all social classes in Mexico. Much of the current layout of the park, with its starburst pattern of paths around fountains and the central kiosk dates from the late 19th and early 20th centuries.

By the late 19th century, the park included a bandstand and gas (now electric) lamps. On the south side of the park, facing toward the street is the Hemiciclo a Juárez, which is a large white semi-circular monument to Benito Juárez, one of Mexico's most beloved presidents.

The park's statues include Désespoire and Malgré Tout, by Jesús Fructuoso Contreras, and a monument donated by the German community which is dedicated to Beethoven in commemoration of the centenary of his 9th Symphony.

In 2012, the park went through a rehabilitation which began in May and was completed in December. The renewal included replacing the damaged pavement with marble, the improvement of the vegetation (including the planting of new trees), new light posts, and improvement of existing park features (e.g. benches and the fountains). As part of the rehabilitation, the once ubiquitous street vendors are no longer allowed to operate within the park.

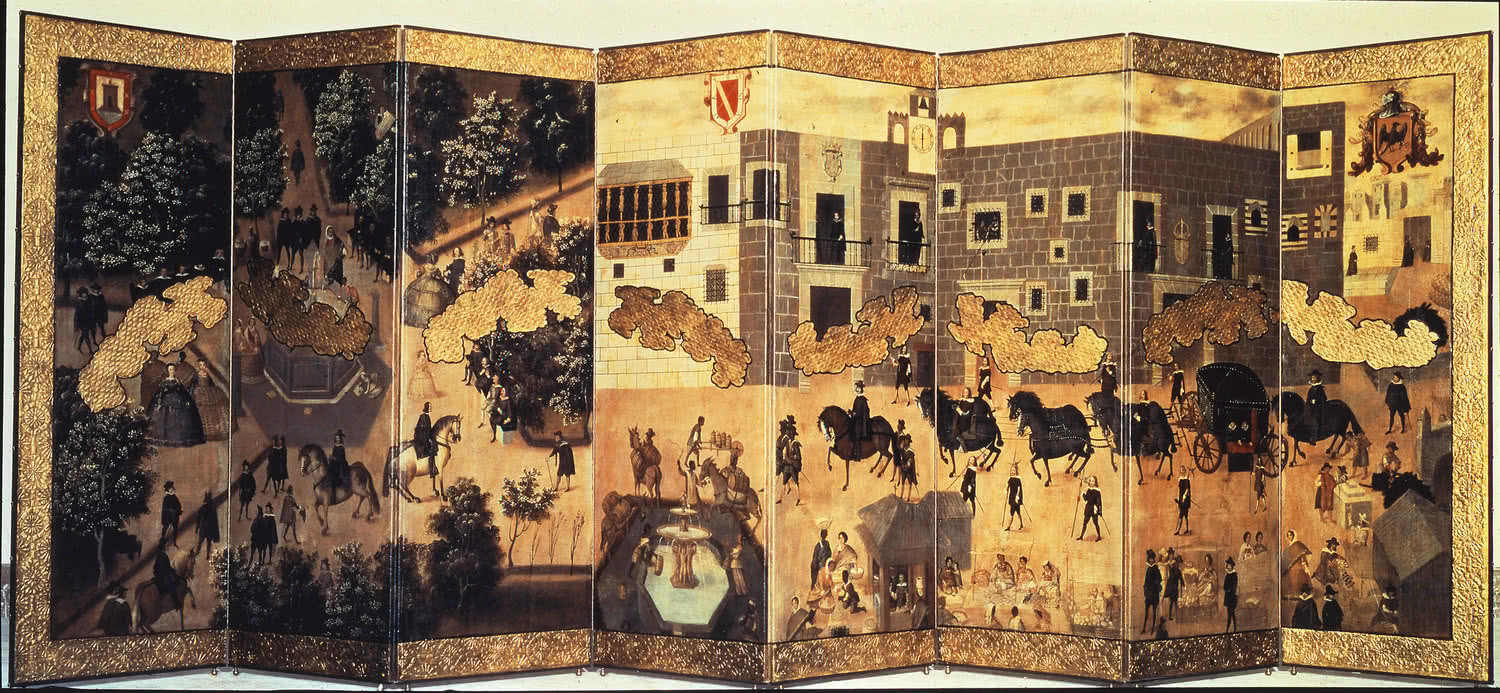
Views of the Alameda (today called Alameda Central) and the Palace of the Viceroys of Mexico, anonymous painter, Mexico City, ca. 1676. Museum of the Americas, Madrid.

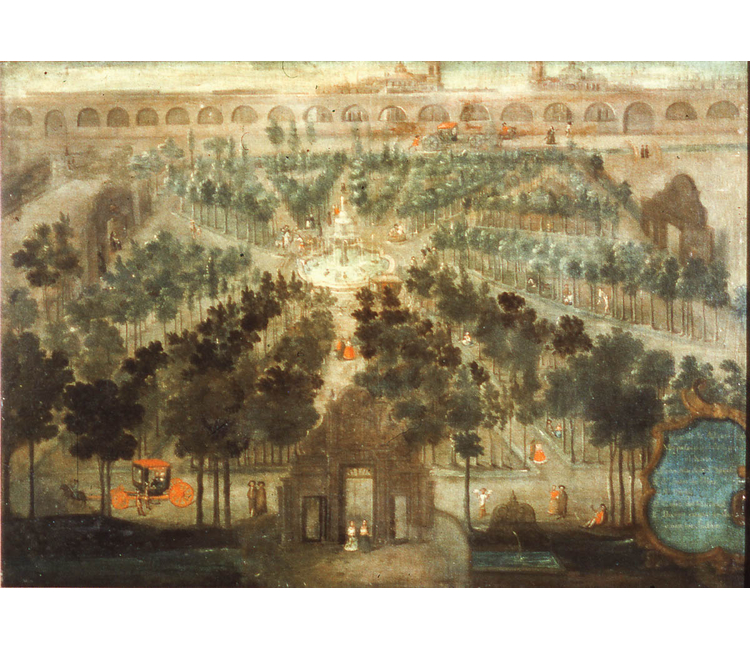
La Alameda de México, anonymous painter, 18th century, Mexico City. Museum of the Americas, Madrid.

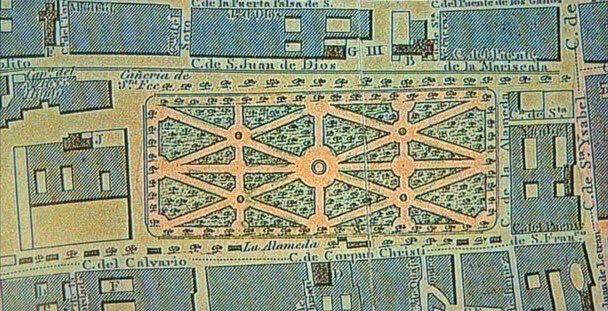
Plan of the Alameda, ca. 18th century

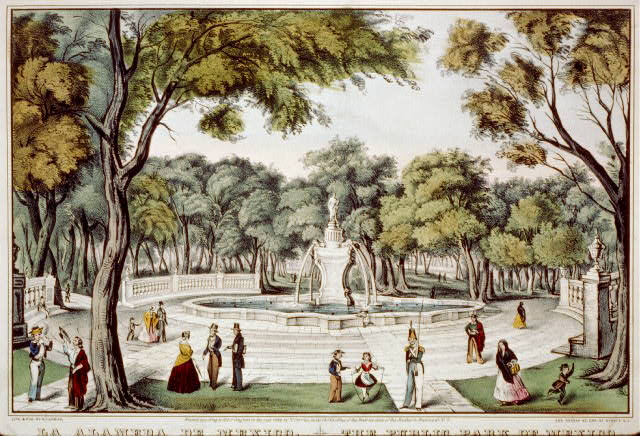
The Alameda Central in 1848 by Nathaniel Currier. Museo Amparo, Puebla City.

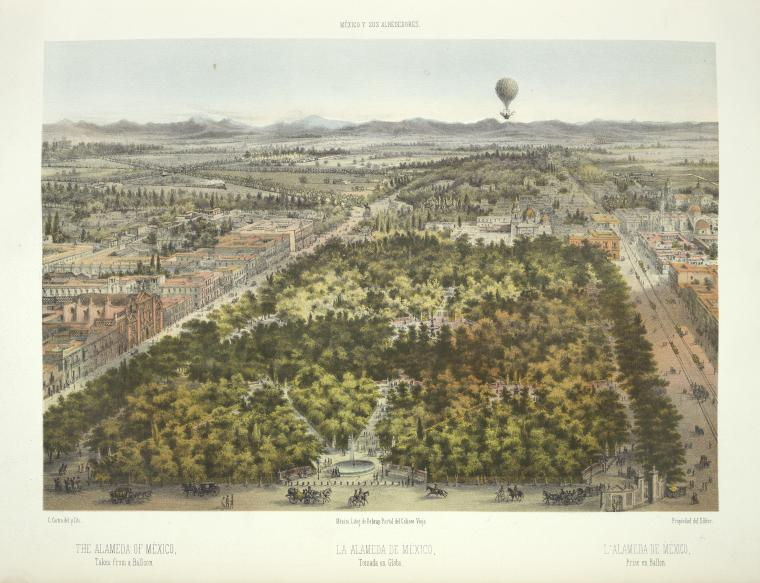
The Alameda of Mexico, taken from a balloon, Casimiro Castro, ca. 1869. New York Public Library.

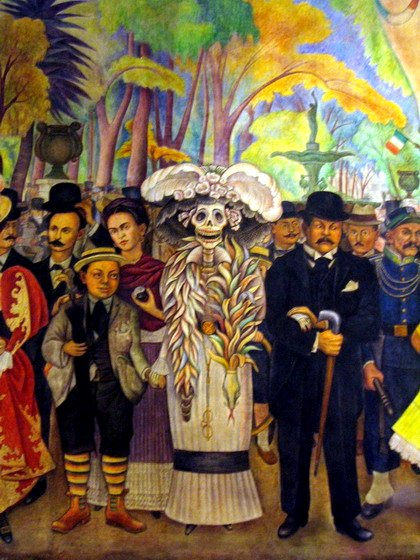
Detail of Diego Rivera's Sueño de una Tarde Dominical en la Alameda Central, 1947

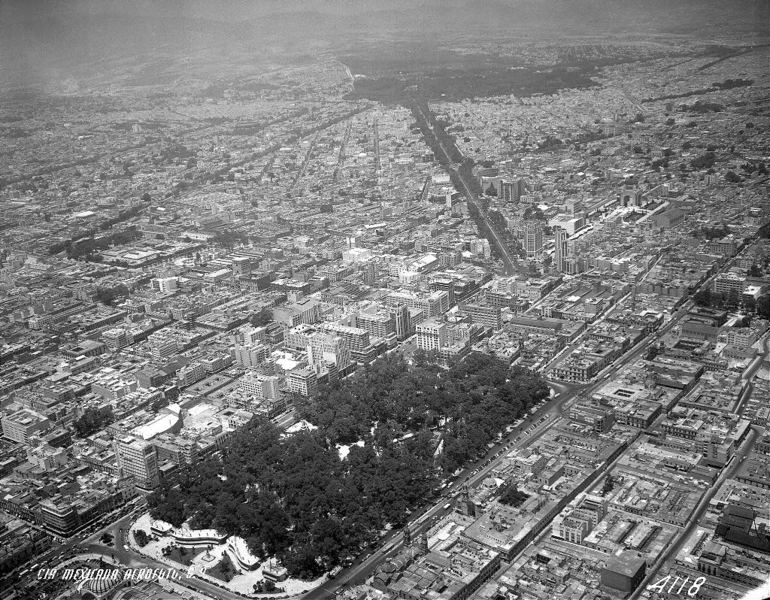
1944 aerial photo of the Alameda Central

During the COVID-19 pandemic, the Mexico City authorities closed the Alameda Central and other public spaces in the historic centre to prevent crowds from gatherings, in an effort to decrease COVID-19 transmissions. The closure of the Alameda and other historic public spaces affected some vulnerable populations, including homeless people, beggars, street vendors, street performers, and male sex workers, to the extent that they resisted leaving or found ways to return to public space, revealing different forms of long-lasting social inequalities and struggles for the use of urban space.

== Gallery ==
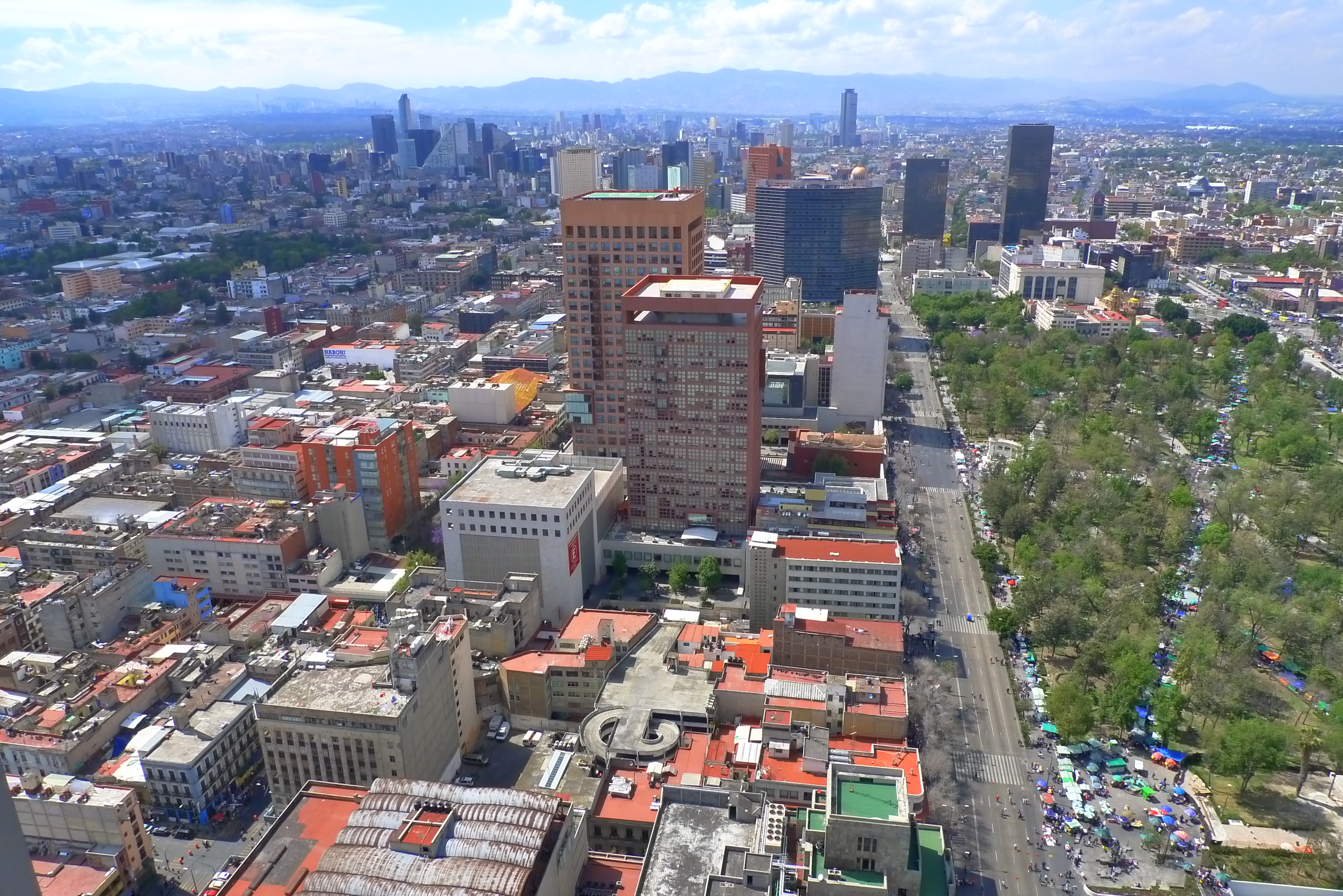
Aerial view and adjacent buildings

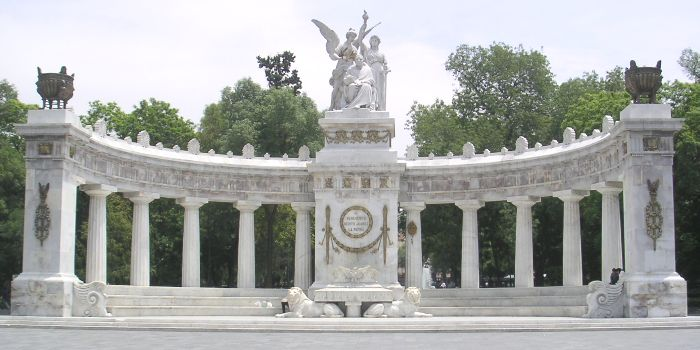
Benito Juárez Hemicycle, 1910

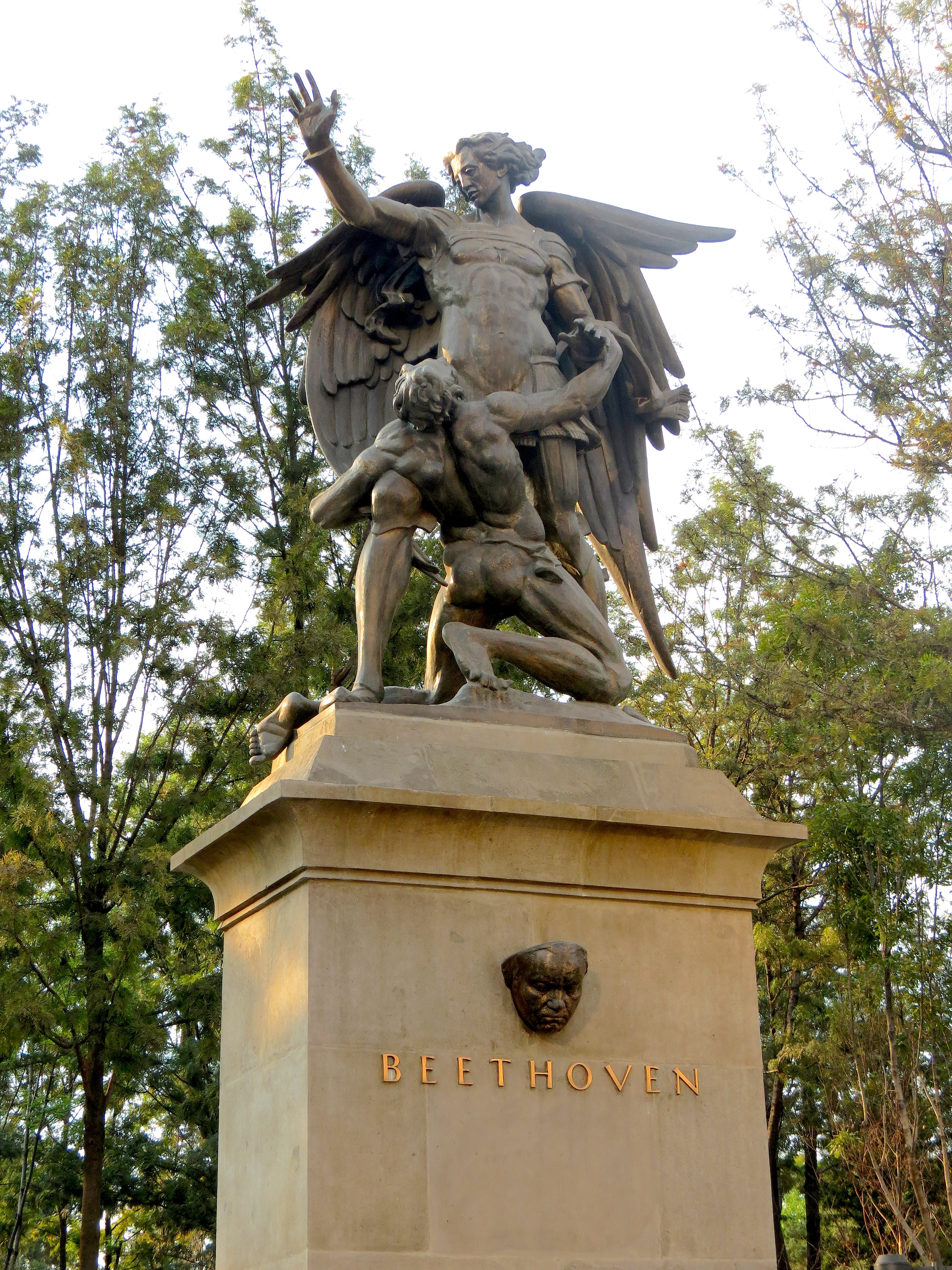
Beethoven Monument, 1921

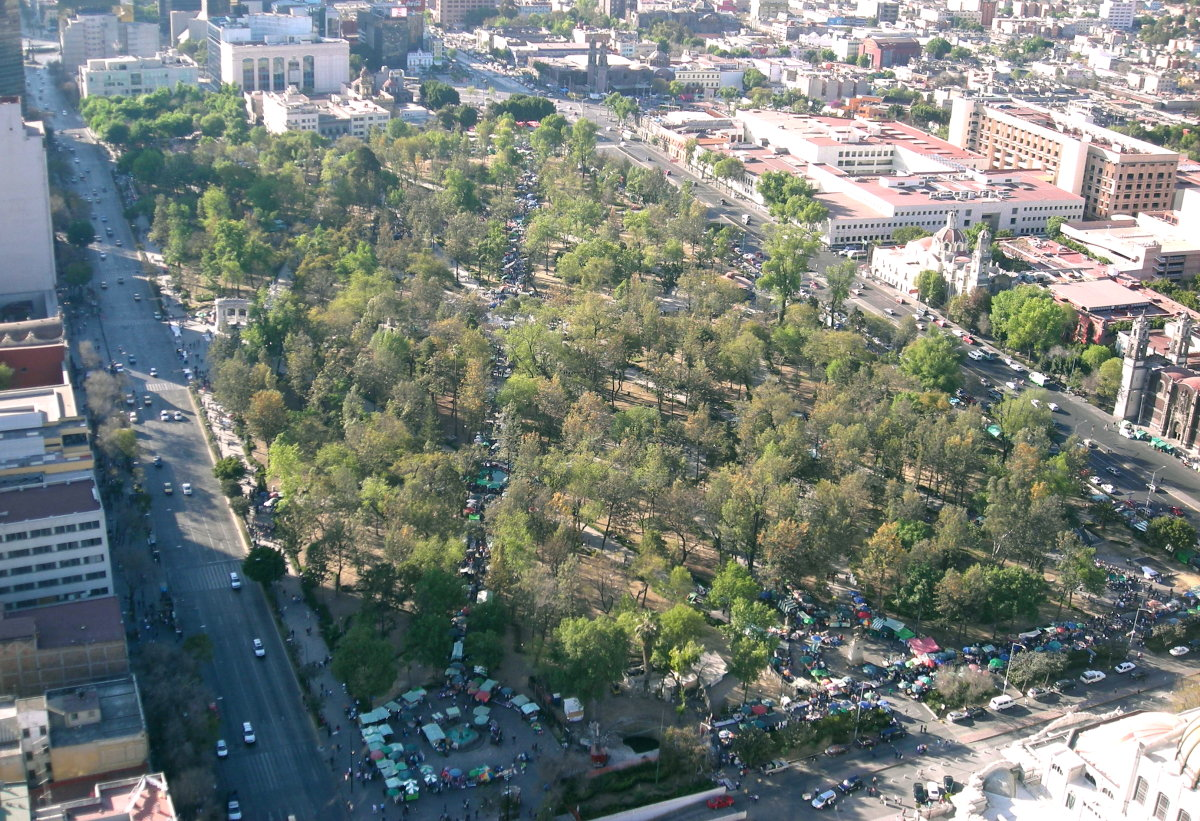
View of the park before the 2012 rehabilitation. Note the many street vendors.

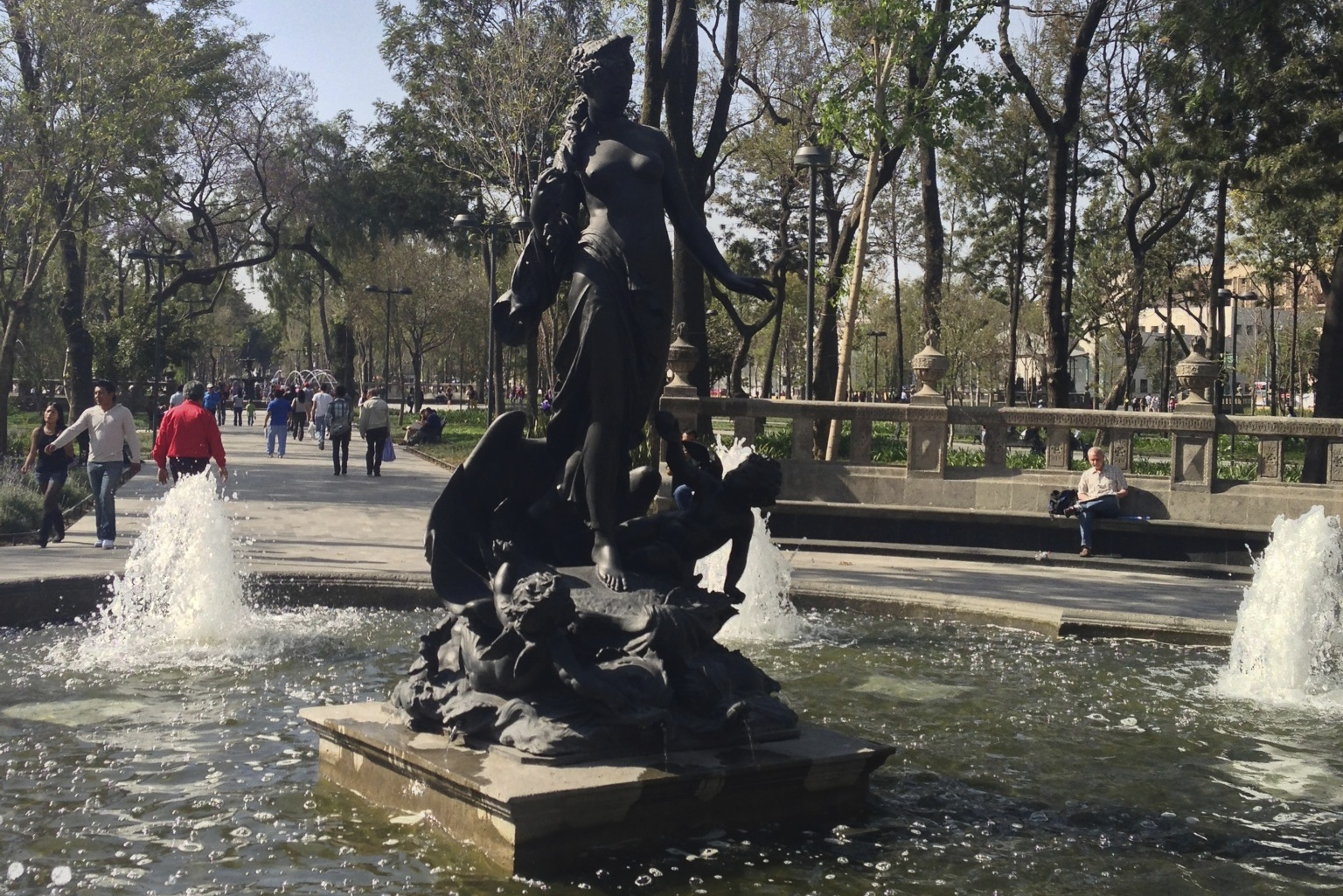
One of the various fountains within the park

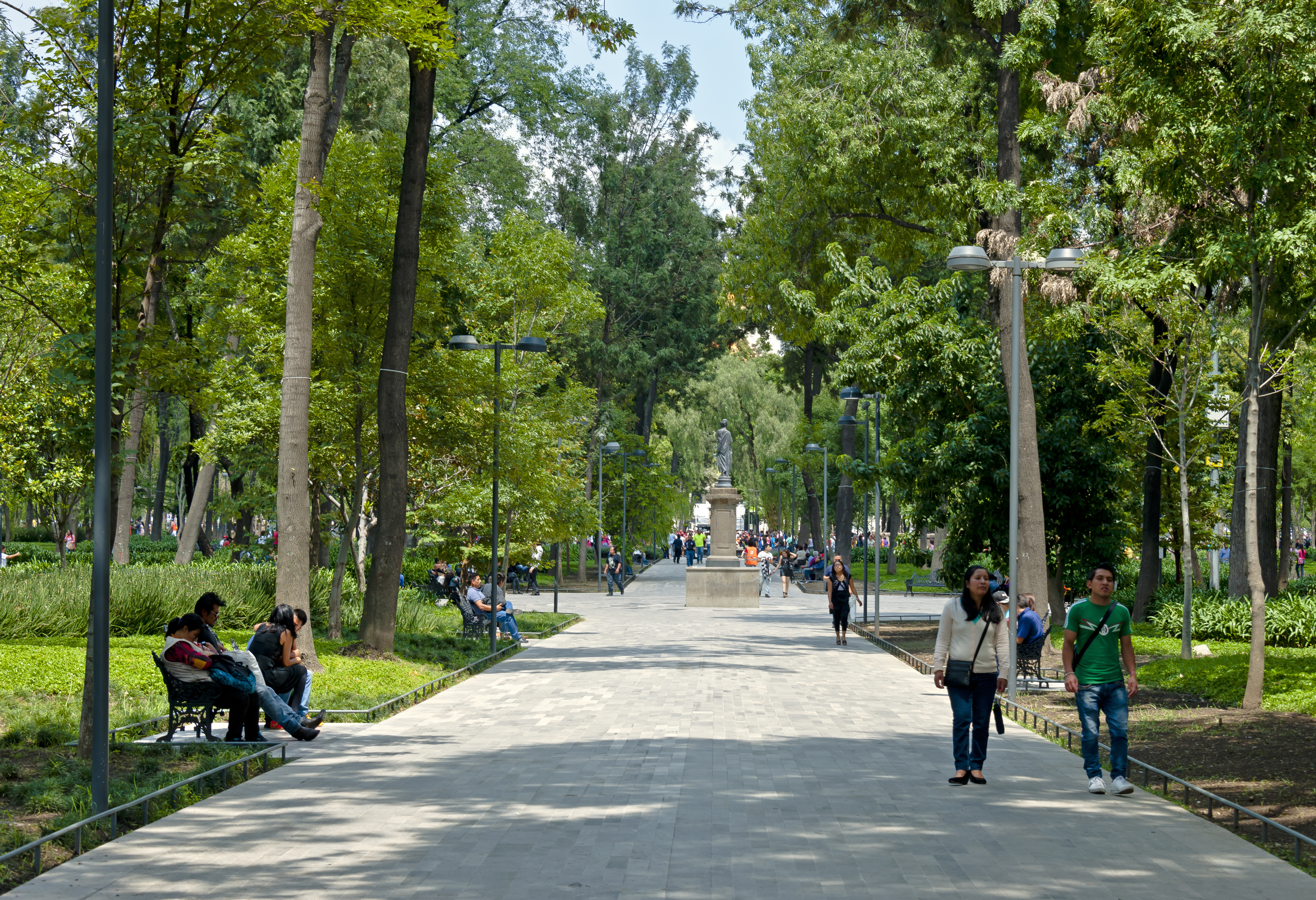
One of the paths through the park

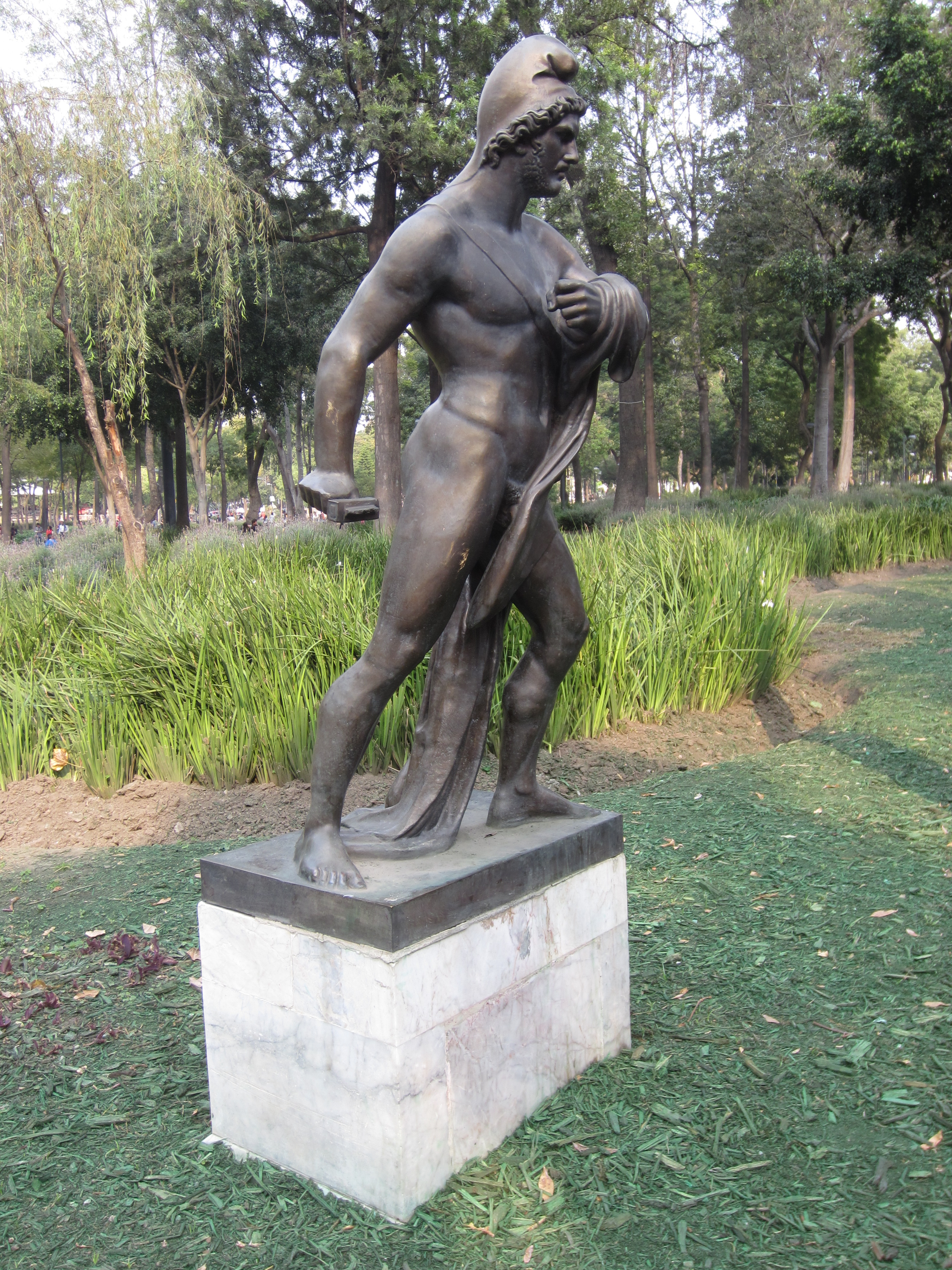
Gladiador frigio by José María Labastida (bronze copy)

== See also ==
- List of oldest buildings in the Americas
