= Fountain of Neptune, Mexico City =

Fountain and sculpture in Mexico City, Mexico

Fountain of Neptune
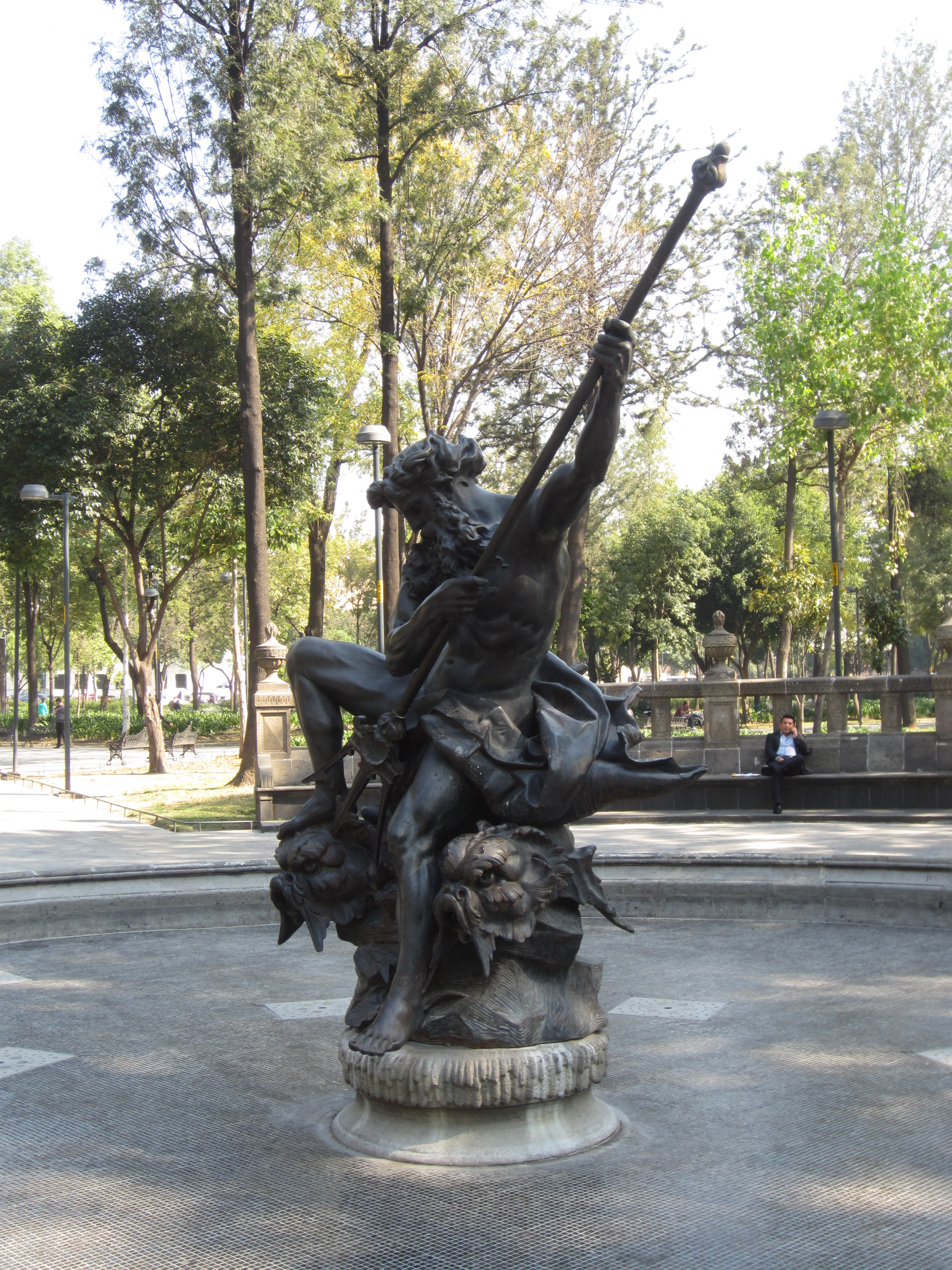
- The fountain in 2018
- Location: Mexico City, Mexico; 19°26′8″N 99°8′42″W

The Fountain of Neptune (Spanish: Fuente de Neptuno) is installed in Mexico City's Alameda Central, in Mexico. The fountain has a bronze sculpture depicting Neptune, the Roman God of the sea.

It was made in 1856 by Vital Gabriel Dubray, and cast in iron by the french company Val d'Osne. Originally destined for a high-class restaurant, it was placed in Alameda Central in 1889.

Identical sculptures are placed in the towns of Clermont-Ferrand, Ghisoni and Sète, France and in the Flora Botanical Garden in Cologne, Germany.
