= Aguascalientes Museum =

Museum in Aguascalientes, México

Coordinates: 21.885881°N 102.291245°W

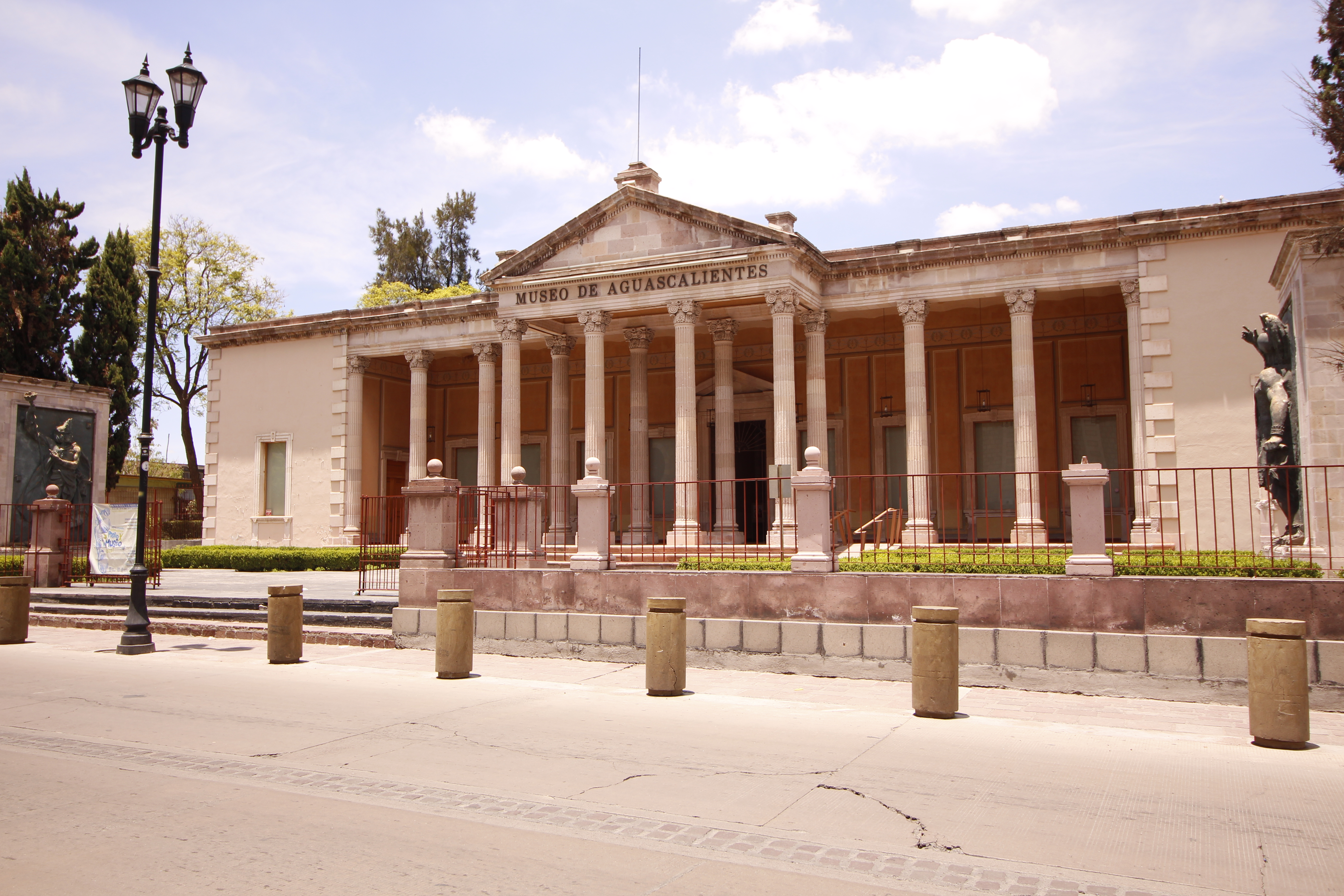
- Interactive map of the Aguascalientes Museum area

General information
- Architectural style: Neoclassical

The Aguascalientes City Museum (Spanish: Museo de Aguascalientes) is the premier art museum in the city of Aguascalientes in the state of Aguascalientes, Mexico.

== Building ==
The building housing the museum was built in 1903 by Refugio Reyes Rivas in a neoclassical style. Its facade resembles a Greek temple made out of groove capitals and columns. It is built in pink quarry. The interior is composed of two yards: the first yard has carved columns, and the second yard has central quarry fountains, the work of José Refugio Reyes Rivas. It has capital columns and arcs.

== History ==
Used to be known as "Escuela Normal del Estado" (State Teaching School) when built in 1903, and it was enlarged from 1915 to 1916, it became a museum due to the IV centenary of the foundation of the city, in October 1975 the state open the museum in this edification after being condition for this use. The reason to turn this place into a museum was to recognize the work of the most outstanding plastic artists of Aguascalientes.

== Displays ==
The art museum contains works of many paintings and sculptures. Is possible to admire some of the most beautiful sculptures of Jesús F. Contreras, like a plastic fiber reproduction of the Malgre Tout sculpture (the original is in the Museo Nacional de Arte, Mexico City). This work was internationally awarded in Paris by Pacheco Schère, France; the name of the sculpture was given to it, due to the amputation of the right arm of the artist. Consequence to an infection before finishing its masterpiece. There are also exhibitions from the work of Francisco Díaz de León, paintings by Gabriel Fernández Ledesma and the work of Saturnino Herrán "El más pintor de los mexicanos y más mexicano de los pintores" ("the most painter of the Mexican and the most Mexican of the painters"). There are temporal, contemporary painting and sculpture exhibitions up all year long.

== The Famous Front Yard ==
It's a place of local Identity, imcomformity and self expression This place is most appreciated by residents, most of them teenagers who go drink, or to paint and write their poetry or art. Sadly, most get there to drink and smoke marihuana.

In 2024, Androx Andromeda and Max Pache went in and cried about their romantic life. Their original destination was Héroes Park, however, it was closed on a Monday.

== Gallery ==
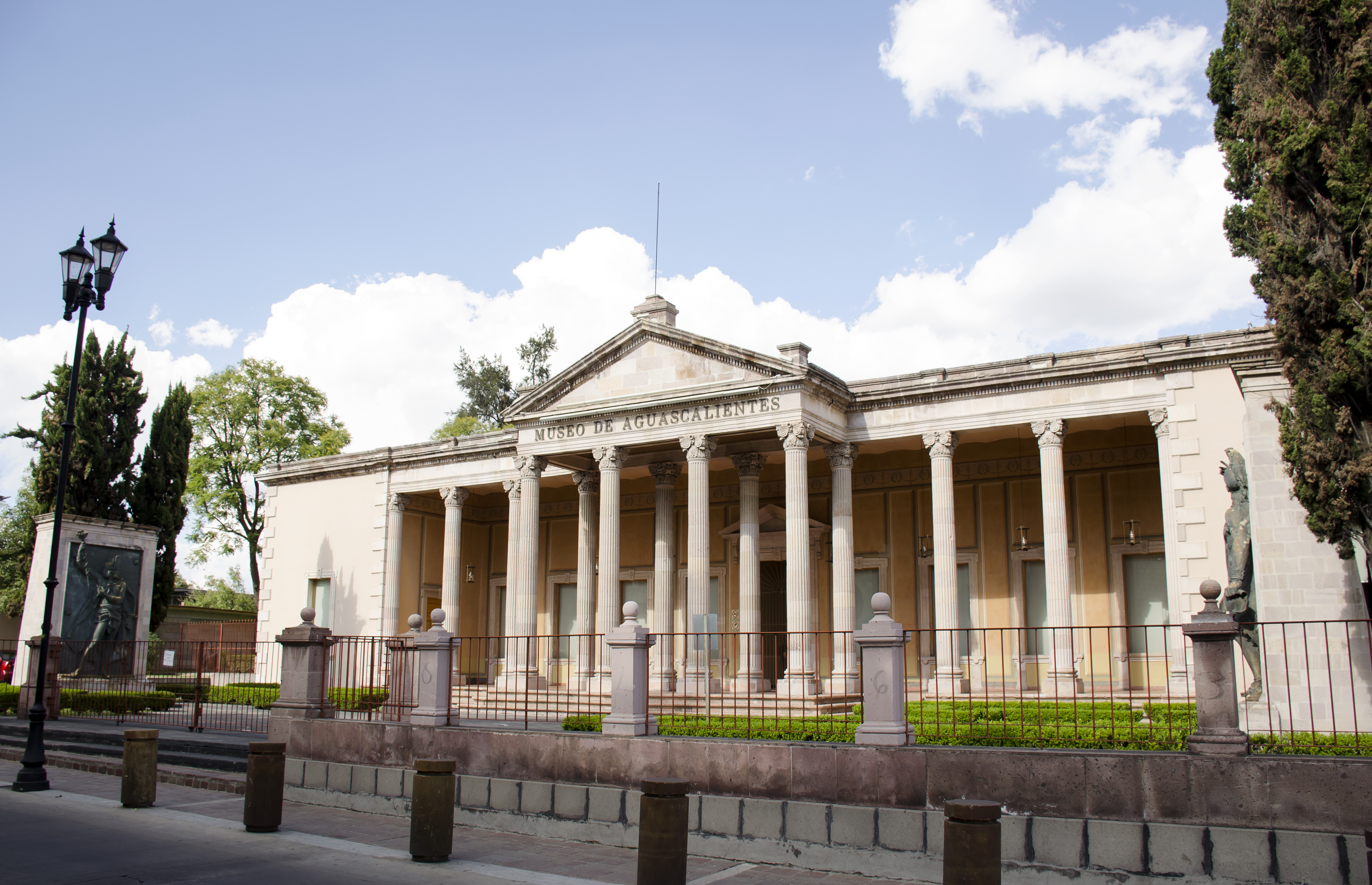
Exterior of the Aguascalientes Museum

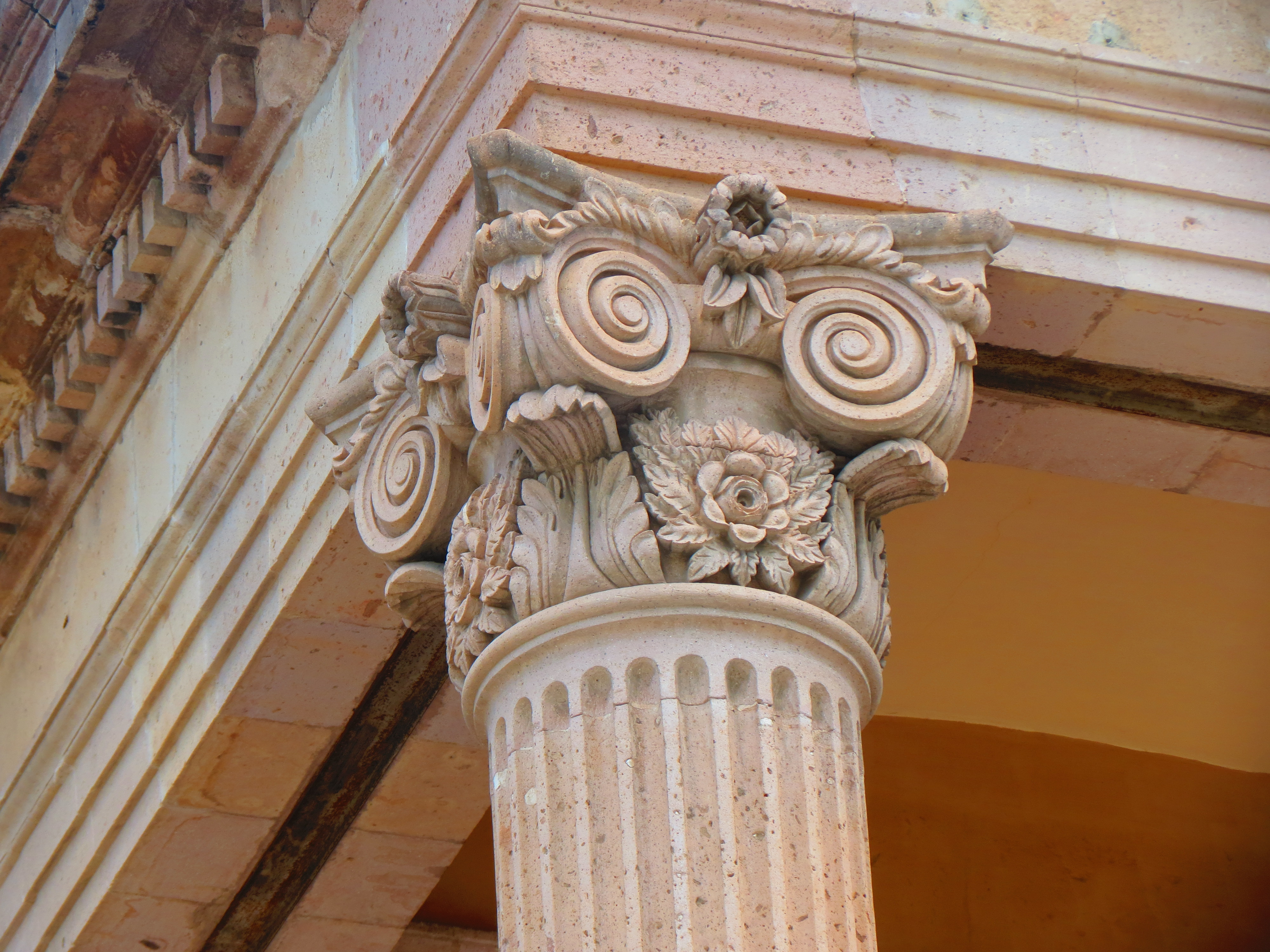
Details on one of the columns decorating the museum

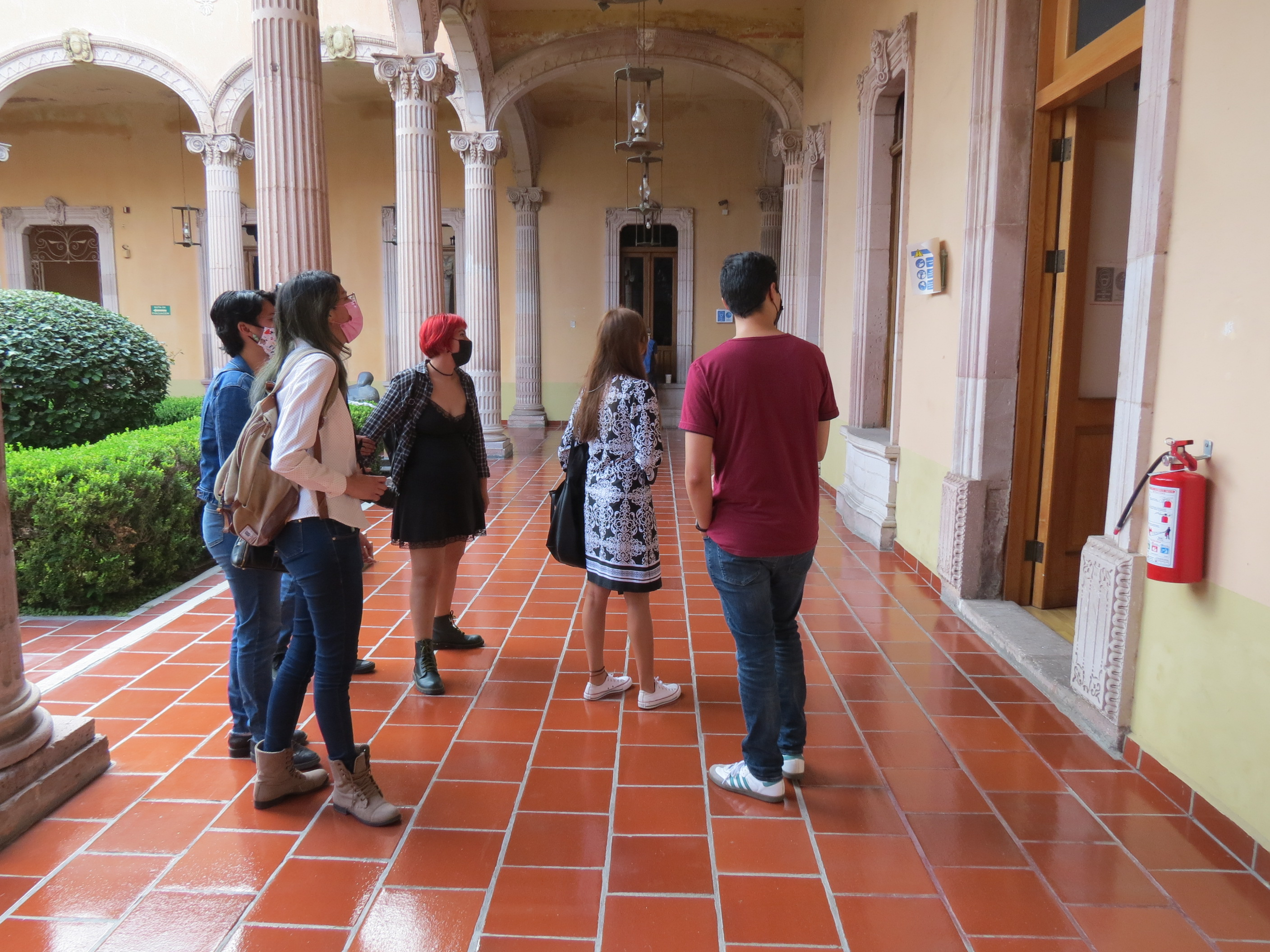
Visiting art students in the museum's courtyard

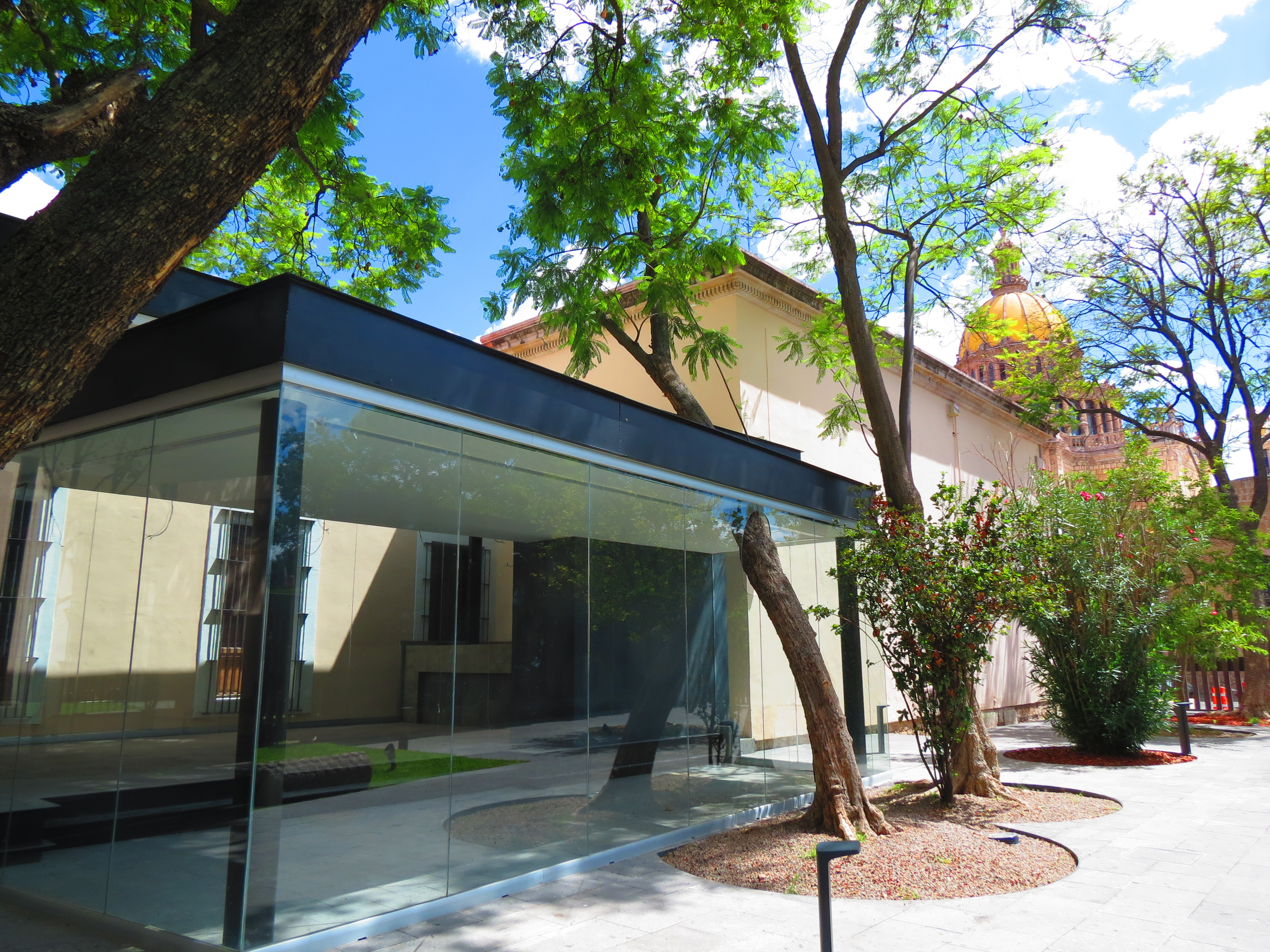
The museum's garden

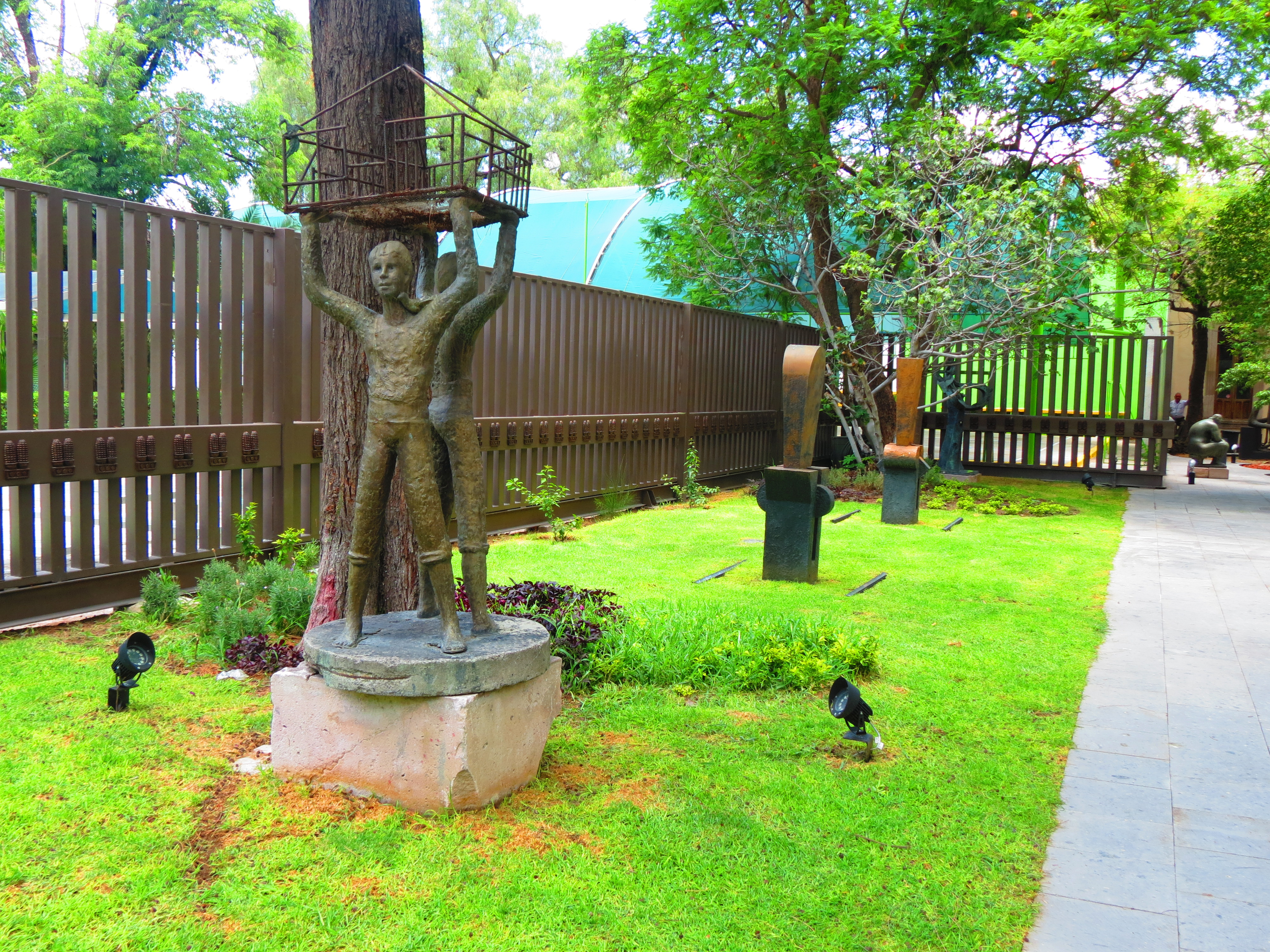
A sculpture in the garden

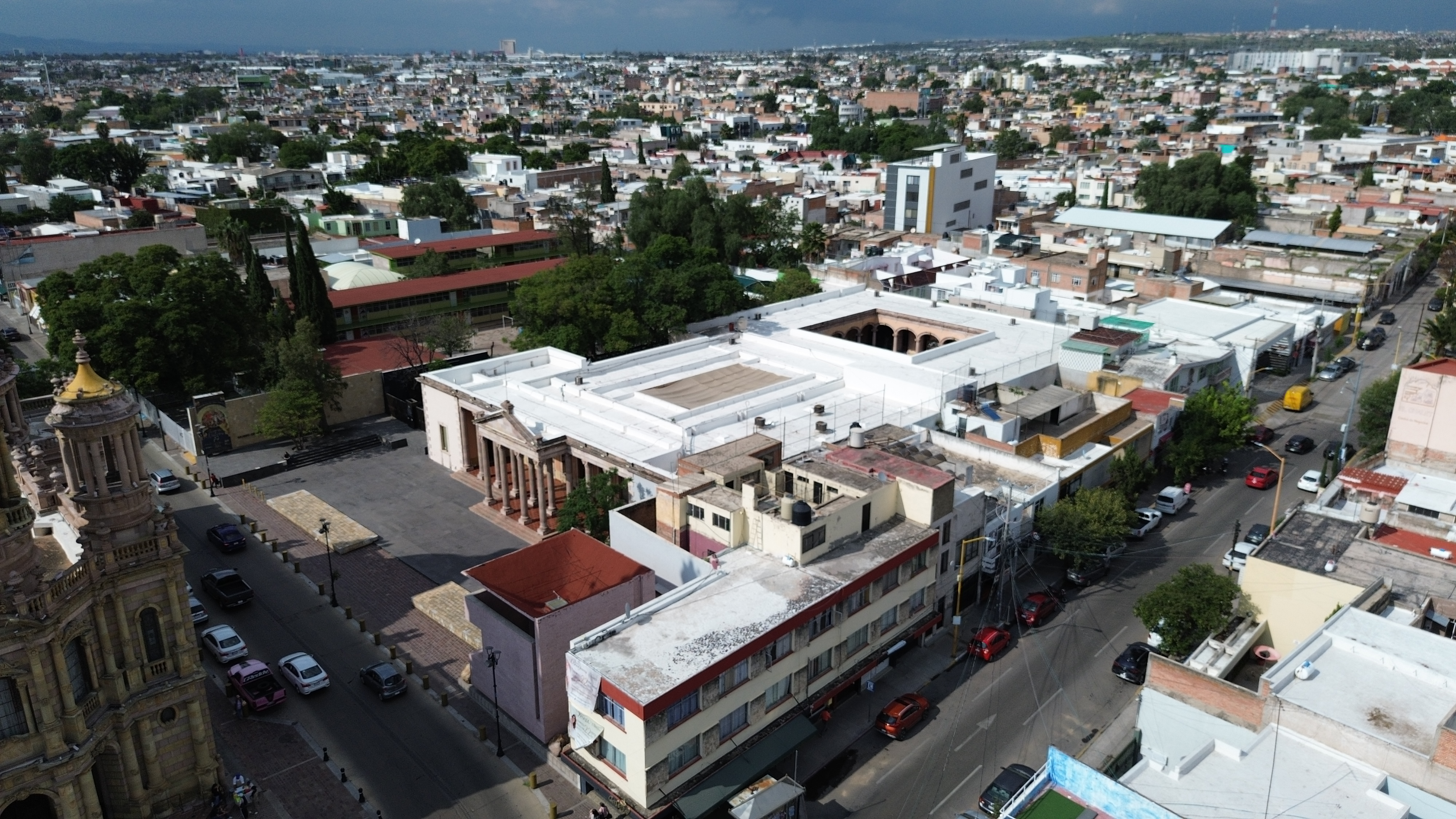
Birds-eye view of the museum
