= Neptunbrunnen (Munich) =

Fountain in Munich, Germany

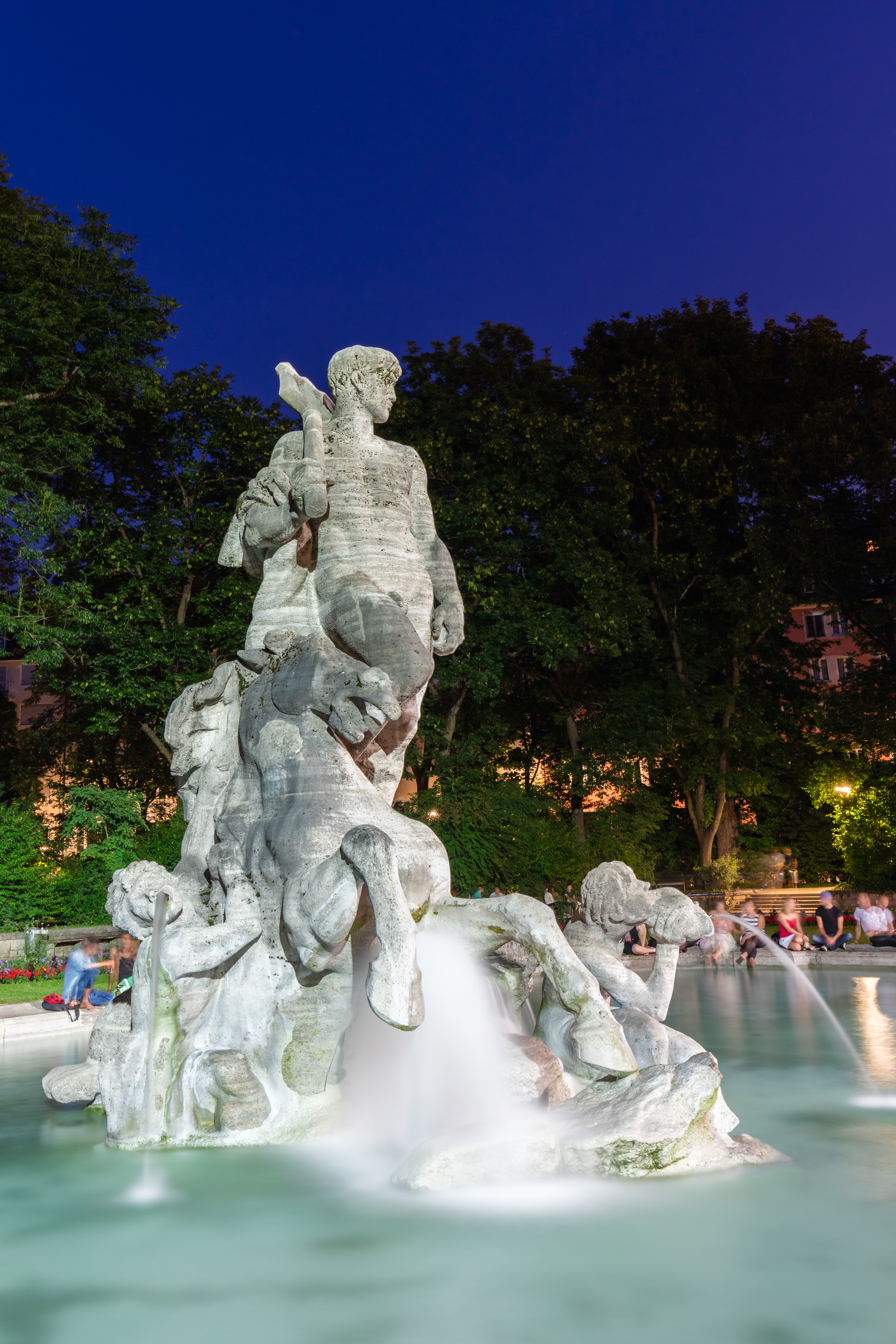
- Fountain of Neptune at dusk.

- Year: 1937
- Subject: Neptune
- Location: Munich; 48°08′29″N 11°33′55″E

Neptunbrunnen is a fountain located in the Alter Botanischer Garten of Munich, Germany. It was sculpted in 1937 at the behest of the National Socialist government by Josef Wackerle. A muscular statue of neptune stands in the middle of the fountain, holding a trident on his shoulder, above a fish-tailed horse rising from the water.
