= List of Guggenheim Fellowships awarded in 1944 =

Sixty-nine Guggenheim Fellowships were awarded in 1944, including thirteen women, the highest number of female recipients ever.

== 1944 U.S. and Canadian Fellows ==
| Category | Field of Study | Fellow | Institutional association | Research topic | Notes | Ref |
|---|---|---|---|---|---|---|
| Creative Arts | Choreography | Martha Graham | | Modern dances | Also won in 1932, 1943 | |
| Creative Arts | Fiction | Marie Campbell | West Georgia College | Stories based on mountain folklore | Also won in 1955 | |
| Creative Arts | Fiction | Israel James Kapstein | | | | |
| Creative Arts | Fiction | J. Saunders Redding | Elizabeth City State College | | Also won in 1959 | |
| Creative Arts | Fine Arts | Donald Harcourt De Lue | | Sculpture | Also won in 1943 | |
| Creative Arts | Fine Arts | Carl L. Schmitz | | Sculpture | | |
| Creative Arts | Fine Arts | Reynold H. Weidenaar | | Etching | | |
| Creative Arts | Fine Arts | Ellis Wilson | | Painting | Also won in 1945 | |
| Creative Arts | Music Composition | Theodore Ward Chanler | | Music composition | Also won in 1956 | |
| Creative Arts | Music Composition | Norman Dello Joio | | Music composition | Also won in 1945 | |
| Creative Arts | Music Composition | Gail T. Kubik | | Music composition | Also won in 1965 | |
| Creative Arts | Music Composition | Normand Lockwood | | Music composition | Also won in 1943 | |
| Creative Arts | Music Composition | Harry Partch | | Music composition | Also won in 1943, 1950 | |
| Creative Arts | Poetry | Howard Baker | University of California | Verse drama of early California | | |
| Creative Arts | Poetry | Oscar Brynes | | Police principles and the problem of peace | Also won in 1938, 1939 | |
| Creative Arts | Poetry | Karl Jay Shapiro | | | Also won in 1953 | |
| Humanities | American Literature | Charles Warren Everett | | | | |
| Humanities | American Literature | Leon Howard | Northwestern University | | | |
| Humanities | American Literature | Harry T. Levin | Harvard University | Technique of symbolism in American fiction, with particular reference to Edgar Allan Poe, Herman Melville, Nathaniel Hawthorne, and Henry James | Also won in 1943 | |
| Humanities | American Literature | Madeleine B. Stern | Long Island City High School | Biography of Louisa May Alcott | Also won in 1943 | |
| Humanities | American Literature | Hugh Mason Wade | | | Also won in 1943 | |
| Humanities | Architecture, Planning and Design | Chloethiel Woodard Smith | University of San Andres | City planning | | |
| Humanities | Biography | Henrietta Buckmaster | | Period 1830-1865 New England, woven around the life of William Lloyd Garrison and covering the development of the anti-slavery movement | | |
| Humanities | British History | William Huse Dunham, Jr. | | | Also won in 1945 | |
| Humanities | English Literature | Arthur E. Barker | | | | |
| Humanities | English Literature | Gerald E. Bentley | | | | |
| Humanities | English Literature | Donald Lemen Clark | Columbia University | John Milton at St. John's School (published 1948) | Also won in 1957 | |
| Humanities | English Literature | Lucy Poate Stebbins | | English women novelists of the 19th century to determine relationship between material and social environment and character of work | | |
| Humanities | English Literature | Carl Jefferson Weber | | | | |
| Humanities | Film, Video and Radio Studies | Siegfried Kracauer | | Social, political, and artistic situation in postwar Germany | Also won in 1943, 1945 | |
| Humanities | Fine Arts Research | Jean Charlot | | The Mexican Mural Renaissance (published 1963) | Also won in 1946 | |
| Humanities | Fine Arts Research | Robert J. Goldwater | | | | |
| Humanities | Fine Arts Research | Elizabeth Wilder Weismann | Library of Congress | Sculpture of the Mexican colonial period | Also won in 1945 | |
| Humanities | Folklore and Popular Culture | Bertrand Harris Bronson | University of California | Musical literary companion to Francis James Child's English and Scottish popular ballads | Also won in 1943, 1948 | |
| Humanities | French History | George P. Cuttino | | | Also won in 1952 | |
| Humanities | General Nonfiction | Carey McWilliams | | Functioning of organized religions as social institutions in the United States | Also won in 1941 | |
| Humanities | Linguistics | Hans Kurath | | | | |
| Humanities | Literary Criticism | Morton Dauwen Zabel | Loyola University Chicago | Life of Joseph Conrad | Also won in 1962 | |
| Humanities | Medieval Literature | Sylvia L. Thrupp | | Social structure and ethical teaching of the Middle Ages | | |
| Humanities | Music Research | Robert Shaw | Berkshire Music Center; Collegiate Chorale | Musical theory and the techniques of instrumental and choral conducting, and preparation of a book on the development of symphonic choruses | | |
| Humanities | Philosophy | Abraham Edel | City College of New York | | | |
| Humanities | Philosophy | Marvin Farber | | | | |
| Humanities | Renaissance History | Josephine Waters Bennett | Hunter College | Cultural development of England, from Chaucer to Moore | Also won in 1955 | |
| Humanities | Spanish and Portuguese Literature | Joaquín Casalduero | | | Also won in 1954 | |
| Humanities | United States History | Adrienne Koch | Office of Economic Warfare | Beginnings of Republican government, viewed through the social and political philosophy of Thomas Jefferson, James Madison, and James Monroe | Also won in 1945 | |
| Humanities | United States History | Henry Fowles Pringle | | History of World War II from standpoints of both the home and military fronts | Also won in 1945 | |
| Natural Sciences | Chemistry | Melvin Calvin | University of California, Berkeley | New methods of synthesis in organic chemistry | | |
| Natural Sciences | Earth Science | Ruben Arthur Stirton | University of California | Search of fossil vertebraes in South America to obtain evidence on dates and position of prehistoric water barriers between American continents | | |
| Natural Sciences | Mathematics | André Weil | | Algebraic geometry | Also won in 1952 | |
| Natural Sciences | Molecular and Cellular Biology | James Angus Jenkins | University of California, Berkeley | Varietal differences in cultivated tomatoes | Also won in 1952 | |
| Natural Sciences | Molecular and Cellular Biology | Frank Harris Johnson | | | Also won in 1945, 1950 | |
| Natural Sciences | Molecular and Cellular Biology | Valy Menkin | Free Hospital for Women | Chemical basis of inflammation in wounds | | |
| Natural Sciences | Molecular and Cellular Biology | Cornelis Bernardus van Niel | | | Also won in 1954 | |
| Natural Sciences | Molecular and Cellular Biology | Janet McCarter Woolley | University of Wisconsin | Action of tuberculin | | |
| Natural Sciences | Organismic Biology and Ecology | Kenneth W. Cooper | Princeton University | Research at the California Institute of Technology | Also won in 1945 | |
| Natural Sciences | Organismic Biology and Ecology | Tilly Edinger | Harvard University | Development of teeth in the evolutionary line leading from ancestral fish to mammals | Also won in 1943 | |
| Natural Sciences | Organismic Biology and Ecology | Joseph Hickey | University of Chicago | Records of banded birds to benefit conservation efforts | Also won in 1947 | |
| Natural Sciences | Organismic Biology and Ecology | Johannes F. Holtfreter | McGill University | Causal factors involved in the embryonic development of vertebrates | Also won in 1945 | |
| Natural Sciences | Plant Science | Emma Lucy Braun | University of Cincinnati | Ecology and taxonomy of the deciduous forest | Also won in 1943 | |
| Natural Sciences | Plant Science | George Neville Jones | | | | |
| Natural Sciences | Plant Science | Bassett Maguire | | | | |
| Natural Sciences | Plant Science | Aaron John Sharp | University of Tennessee | Phytogeographical relationship between the highlands of Mexico and the Southern Appalachian Mountains | Also won in 1945 | |
| Natural Sciences | Plant Science | William N. Takahashi | Cornell University (visiting) | Mechanism of virus reproduction | | |
| Natural Sciences | Plant Science | Paul Weatherwax | Indiana University | Origins of corn | | |
| Social Science | Economics | Harold Amos Logan | University of Toronto | | | |
| Social Science | Political Science | Walter Bernhard Schiffer | Institute for Advanced Study | Conflicting theoretical ideas underlying establishment and activity of the League of Nations | Also won in 1946 | |
| Social Science | Psychology | Hudson Hoagland | Smith College | Form and meaning in Cervantes' Don Quixote and Persiles | | |
| Social Science | Psychology | Theodore Christian Schneirla | | | Also won in 1945 | |
| Social Science | Sociology | Robert England | | Demobilization problems in Allied Nations and Germany | | |

== 1944 Latin American and Caribbean Fellows ==
| Category | Field of Study | Fellow | Institutional association | Research topic | Notes | Ref |
|---|---|---|---|---|---|---|
| Creative Arts | Fine Arts | Lily Garafulic | University of Chile | | | |
| Creative Arts | Fine Arts | Mauricio Lasansky | | Work at Atelier 17 | Also won in 1943, 1945, 1953, 1964 | |
| Humanities | Philosophy | Euryalo Cannabrava | Colégio Pedro II | | Also won in 1945 | |
| Humanities | Philosophy | Jorge Millas | University of Chile | | | |
| Humanities | United States History | Raúl Roa y García | University of Havana | | | |
| Natural Sciences | Astronomy and Astrophysics | Guido Munch Paniagua | National Astronomical Observatory | Theoretical astrophysics | Also won in 1945, 1958 | |
| Natural Sciences | Chemistry | Rafael Aureliano Labriola | University of Buenos Aires | Research at the University of Minnesota and University of Wisconsin | | |
| Natural Sciences | Mathematics | Alberto Barajas Celis | National Autonomous University of Mexico | Research at Harvard University | | |
| Natural Sciences | Organismic Biology and Ecology | Eduardo Caballero y Caballero | National Autonomous University of Mexico | | | |
| Natural Sciences | Organismic Biology and Ecology | Manuel Maldonado Koerdell | Autonomous University of Nuevo León | Comparative anatomy | Also won in 1945 | |
| Natural Sciences | Plant Sciences | Elisa Hirschhorn | | Plant disease fungi | Also won in 1945 | |
| Social Sciences | Economics | Adolfo Dorfman | | | Also won in 1943 | |
| Social Sciences | Law | Enrique Testa Arueste | University of Chile | | | |

== See also ==
- Guggenheim Fellowship
- List of Guggenheim Fellowships awarded in 1943
- List of Guggenheim Fellowships awarded in 1945
