= List of Guggenheim Fellowships awarded in 1945 =

Ninety-six Guggenheim Fellowships were awarded in 1945. More than 36 additional awards were postservice fellowships given to artists and scholars unable to apply in previous years due to the war.

== 1945 Post-Service Fellows ==
Category	Field of Study	Fellow	Branch/service	Civilian institution	Research topic	Notes	Ref
Creative Arts	Fine Arts	Donald Whitney Burns			Painting: Oil industry's part in World War II		
Creative Arts	Fine Arts	Adolph Dioda			Sculpture		
Creative Arts	Fine Arts	Frank Davenport Duncan				Also won in 1947	
Creative Arts	Fine Arts	James E. Peck	United States Army Air Force		Painting: Ohio landscapes		
Creative Arts	Fine Arts	Edward A. Reep	United States Army		Painting		
Creative Arts	Fine Arts	Mitchell Siporin	United States Army			Also won in 1947	
Creative Arts	Fine Arts	Frank Vavruska	United States Army		Painting: Works based on his convalescence in England in World War II		
Creative Arts	Fine Arts	Frede Vidar	United States Army		Painting: Southwest Pacific, based on combat sketches		
Creative Arts	Fine Arts	Rudolph Charles von Ripper				Also won in 1947	
Creative Arts	Fiction	Oliver La Farge	Air Transport Command		History of the Air Transport Command	Also won in 1941	
Creative Arts	Fiction	Caroline Bache McMahon	Office of Strategic Services		Book about Japan		
Creative Arts	Fiction	William E. Wilson	United States Navy		Writing	Also won in 1944	
Creative Arts	Poetry	Ben Belitt	United States Army		Prose based on his army experience		
Humanities	American Literature	Lawrance Thompson		Princeton University Library	Biography of Robert Frost		
Humanities	Biography	John Edwin Bakeless	United States Navy	New York University	Biography of Lewis and Clark	Also won in 1936	
Humanities	Classics	Walter Allen, Jr.	United States Navy	Yale University	Cicero and great Roman nobles		
Humanities	Economic History	Henry William Spiegel		Duquesne University	Industrial planning in Brazil		
Humanities	English Literature	Gordon Norton Ray	United States Navy	Harvard University	Edition of the letters and private papers of Thackeray	Also won in 1941, 1942, 1956	
Humanities	Fine Arts Research	Harry Bober		City College of New York	Study of the printed books of hours, their development, style, schools, iconography, and influences		
Humanities	French History	William Farr Church	United States Army	University of Kentucky	Political thought in 17th-century France	Also won in 1948, 1953	
Humanities	General Nonfiction	Hodding Carter		Delta Democrat Times	Establishment of the West Florida Republic		
Humanities	General Nonfiction	Paul G. Horgan	United States Army	New Mexico Military Institute	Rio Grande	Also won in 1958	
Humanities	History of Science and Technology	Edward Rosen	United States Army Air Corps	City College of New York	Place of Copernicus in the development of modern thought	Also won in 1941	
Humanities	Italian Literature	Bernard Weinberg	Washington University in St. Louis	United States Army	Literary theory in the Italian Renaissance		
Humanities	Medieval History	Barnaby Conrad Keeney		Harvard University	Origin and development of the feudal institution, and judgment by peers on the Continent and in England		
Humanities	Medieval Literature	Claude Willis Barlow	United States Army	Mount Holyoke College	Critical edition of the works of St. Martin of Braga		
Humanities	Near Eastern Studies	Donald E. McCown		University of Chicago	Early cultures of Baluchistan, and the relationships of the civilizations of the Indus Valley and Mesopotamia during the third millennium		
Humanities	Philosophy	Morris T. Keeton		Southern Methodist University	Evaluation of the work of Edmund Montgomery		
Humanities	Philosophy	Revilo P. Oliver	United States Army	University of Illinois	Ethico-philosophical content of humanism of the first half of the 15th century		
Humanities	United States History	Adrienne Koch	Office of Economic Warfare		Social and political philosophy of Thomas Jefferson, James Madison, and James Monroe	Also won in 1944	
Humanities	United States History	Dale L. Morgan	Office of Price Administration		History of Mormonism and the Mormons, with particular reference to the influence of the Mormons upon American life since 1830	Also won in 1970	
Humanities	United States History	Henry Fowles Pringle			History of World War II on the home front and the military front	Also won in 1944	
Humanities	United States History	Henry L. Smith		University of Minnesota	America's part in the development of world air routes and the history of American foreign air policy		
Humanities	United States History	C. Vann Woodward	United States Navy Reserve	Scripps College	Origins of the New South, 1880-1913 (published 1951)	Also won in 1959	
Natural Sciences	Applied Mathematics	Leo Beranek	Office of Scientific Research and Development	Harvard University	Acoustics		
Natural Sciences	Medicine and Health	Orville T. Bailey	Office of Scientific Research and Development	Harvard Medical School	Application of physiological methods to problems of degeneration in nerve fibers and myelin sheaths		
Natural Sciences	Organismic Biology and Ecology	Harold Francis Blum	United States Naval Research Laboratory		Evaluation of evolutionary concepts	Also won in 1936, 1953	
Natural Sciences	Physics	Charles Kittel	United States Navy		Electrical and mechanical properties of matter at microwave radio frequencies	Also won in 1956, 1963	
Natural Sciences	Plant Science	E. Yale Dawson	United States Army	University of California	Marine algae and marine flora on the Pacific coast of Mexico and Central America		
Natural Sciences	Plant Science	Roy Overstreet		University of California	Absorption and behavior of inorganic ions in plant nutrition	Also won in 1957	
Social Sciences	Anthropology and Cultural Studies	Roy Franklin Barton		St. Andrews High School	Philippine folklore	Also won in 1941	
Social Sciences	Anthropology and Cultural Studies	Dorothy Mary Spencer	Office of Strategic Services		Munda people	Also won in 1941	
Social Sciences	Education	Robert King Hall	United States Navy	Harvard University	Educational system in Japan with a view to rehabilitation after the war	Also won in 1949, 1952	
Social Sciences	Political Science	Richard Poate Stebbins	Office of Strategic Services		Historical study of art patronage		
Social Sciences	Psychology	G. LaVerne Freeman	United States Navy	Northwestern University	Nervous tension in man		
Social Sciences	Psychology	Alexander H. Leighton	United States Navy		Comparative study of Navajo, Eskimo, and Japanese peoples		
Social Sciences	Psychology	Dorothea Leighton			Comparative study of Navajo, Eskimo, and Japanese peoples	Also won in 1947	
Social Sciences	Sociology	Herbert Aptheker	United States Army		African Americans in World War II		

== 1945 U.S. and Canadian Fellows ==
Category	Field of Study	Fellow	Institutional association	Research topic	Notes	Ref
Creative Arts	Fine Arts	Karl E. Fortress				
Creative Arts	Fine Arts	Donal Hord			Also won in 1947	
Creative Arts	Fine Arts	Fred Kabotie		Prehistoric Mimbres pottery		
Creative Arts	Fine Arts	Edward Laning				
Creative Arts	Fine Arts	Jacob Lawrence		Painting: Harlem life and 14-panel series on war		
Creative Arts	Fine Arts	Jack Levine		Painting	Also won in 1947	
Creative Arts	Fine Arts	Eleanor Platt		Sculpture		
Creative Arts	Fine Arts	Ellis Wilson		Painting	Also won in 1944	
Creative Arts	Fiction	Robert Pick		Writing		
Creative Arts	Fiction	Jean Stafford		Writing	Also won in 1948	
Creative Arts	Music Composition	Samuel Barber		Composition	Also won in 1947, 1949	
Creative Arts	Music Composition	Charles F. Bryan		Composition		
Creative Arts	Music Composition	Elliott Carter		Composition	Also won in 1950	
Creative Arts	Music Composition	Lukas Foss	Boston Symphony Orchestra	Composition	Also won in 1959	
Creative Arts	Music Composition	Norman Dello Joio		Composition	Also won in 1944	
Creative Arts	Music Composition	Dai-keong Lee		Composition	Also won in 1951	
Creative Arts	Music Composition	Nikolai Lopatnikoff		Composition	Also won in 1953	
Creative Arts	Photography	Jack Delano	Farm Security Administration; Office of War Information			
Creative Arts	Photography	Theodore Brett Weston		East Coast		
Creative Arts	Poetry	Stanley J. Kunitz		Writing		
Creative Arts	Poetry	Marianne Moore		Writing		
Creative Arts	Poetry	Theodore Roethke		Writing	Also won in 1950	
Humanities	American Literature	Richard Beale Davis	University of South Carolina		Also won in 1959	
Humanities	American Literature	Richard Gordon Lillard	Indiana University	Part played in American history by the forest between the Atlantic Ocean and the Mississippi River	Also won in 1946	
Humanities	American Literature	Ralph Leslie Rusk	Columbia University	Ralph Waldo Emerson		
Humanities	Architecture, Design and Planning	Henry-Russell Hitchcock				
Humanities	Biography	Marie Kimball		Thomas Jefferson, 1776-1789, including his governorship of Virginia and his ministry to France	Also won in 1946	
Humanities	British History	Franklin Le Van Baumer	Yale University			
Humanities	British History	William Huse Dunham, Jr.	Yale University		Also won in 1944	
Humanities	British History	Garrett Mattingly	Long Island University		Also won in 1936, 1953, 1960	
Humanities	Classics	Thomas R. S. Broughton	Bryn Mawr College	Preparation of an annual list of the magistrates of the Roman Republic, including minor officials and members of the priestly colleges	Also won in 1958	
Humanities	Classics	Israel E. Drabkin				
Humanities	Classics	Louis Alexander MacKay	University of British Columbia	Structure and composition of the Iliad		
Humanities	English Literature	James Emerson Phillips, Jr.	University of California, Los Angeles			
Humanities	English Literature	Frederick A. Pottle	Yale University	James Boswell	Also won in 1952	
Humanities	Film, Video and Radio Studies	Siegfried Kracauer		"Social, political, and artistic situation of postwar Germany"	Also won in 1943, 1944	
Humanities	Fine Arts Research	Otto Benesch	Harvard University	Corpus of Rembrandt's drawings	Also won in 1942	
Humanities	Fine Arts Research	Edward Millman				
Humanities	Fine Arts Research	Elizabeth Wilder Weismann	Library of Congress	Studies and sculpture of colonial Mexico	Also won in 1944	
Humanities	Folklore and Popular Culture	George Kumler Anderson				
Humanities	Folklore and Popular Culture	C. Grant Loomis	University of California, Berkeley	White magic and the miracles of Christian legend		
Humanities	General Nonfiction	Jerre G. Mangione				
Humanities	General Nonfiction	Bradford Smith		Narrative on immigration of Japanese to the United States	Also won in 1946	
Humanities	German and East European History	Hans Rosenberg	Brooklyn College	Book titled The Prusso-German Junkers: A History of a Social Class	Also won in 1946	
Humanities	German and Scandinavian Literature	Alrik Gustafson	University of Minnesota	Biography of August Strindberg	Also won in 1946	
Humanities	Intellectual and Cultural History	Ernest Campbell Mossner	Syracuse University		Also won in 1939	
Humanities	Intellectual and Cultural History	John William Shirley	Michigan State College	Unpublished manuscripts of Thomas Hariot		
Humanities	Medieval History	Benjamin N. Nelson		Relations between conscious and casuistry in the moral philosophy and law of the later Middle Ages (12th-16th centuries)		
Humanities	Medieval Literature	Charles W. Jones	Cornell University	History of Romanesque literature in Western Europe between approx. 325 and 1125 A.D.	Also won in 1939	
Humanities	Medieval Literature	Mary Hatch Marshall	Colby College	History of the medieval religious plays of France, Germany, and England exclusive of the saints' plays	Also won in 1946	
Humanities	Music Research	Richard S. Angell	Columbia University	Organization of music libraries and archives		
Humanities	Music Research	Jacques Barzun	Columbia University	Hector Berlioz		
Humanities	Philosophy	Frederic Brenton Fitch	Yale University			
Humanities	Philosophy	Abraham Kaplan				
Humanities	Philosophy	Norman A. Malcolm	Princeton University			
Humanities	Philosophy	Charles Leslie Stevenson	Yale University			
Humanities	Philosophy	Frederick Ludwig Will	University of Illinois	Theory of knowledge, with special reference to the problems of empiricism		
Humanities	United States History	Clement Eaton	Lafayette College	Liberalism in the New South, 1865-1929		
Humanities	United States History	Paul Henry Giddens	Allegheny College	Growth of the petroleum industry in the United States, 1870-1895		
Humanities	United States History	Merrill Monroe Jensen	University of Wisconsin	History of the United States during the confederation period, 1781-1789		
Natural Sciences	Astronomy and Astrophysics	Samuel Herrick	University of California		Also won in 1952	
Natural Sciences	Chemistry	Lindsay Helmholz	Dartmouth College			
Natural Sciences	Chemistry	Dean S. Tarbell	Office of Scientific Research and Development		Also won in 1961	
Natural Sciences	Mathematics	John Williams Calkin	Office of Chief of Naval Operations		Also won in 1946	
Natural Sciences	Mathematics	Paul Erdős			Also won in 1946	
Natural Sciences	Mathematics	Edwin Hewitt	Harvard University	Topology	Also won in 1955	
Natural Sciences	Mathematics	Walter H. Pitts	Massachusetts Institute of Technology		Also won in 1947	
Natural Sciences	Medicine and Health	Chandler McCuskey Brooks	Office of Scientific Research and Development			
Natural Sciences	Molecular and Cellular Biology	Damon Boynton	Cornell University	Ion competition as a factor in the nutrition of plants		
Natural Sciences	Molecular and Cellular Biology	Britton Chance	University of Pennsylvania		Also won in 1947	
Natural Sciences	Molecular and Cellular Biology	Seymour S. Cohen	Office of Scientific Research and Development		Also won in 1982	
Natural Sciences	Molecular and Cellular Biology	Denis Llewellyn Fox	Scripps Institution of Oceanography			
Natural Sciences	Molecular and Cellular Biology	Frank H. Johnson	Princeton University	Fundamental mechanisms that control biological processes and phenomena	Also won in 1944, 1950	
Natural Sciences	Molecular and Cellular Biology	Roger Yate Stanier	Merck & Co.	Nature, relationships, and biological activities of bacteria, particularly myxobacteria	Also won in 1951, 1967	
Natural Sciences	Organismic Biology and Ecology	Kenneth W. Cooper	Princeton University	Research at the California Institute of Technology	Also won in 1944	
Natural Sciences	Organismic Biology and Ecology	Ellsworth Charles Dougherty	University of California	Certain parasitic nematodes	Also won in 1948	
Natural Sciences	Organismic Biology and Ecology	Johannes F. Holtfreter	McGill University	Genetics	Also won in 1944	
Natural Sciences	Organismic Biology and Ecology	Lewis H. Kleinholz	Cambridge Junior College	Physiological and chemical interrelationships in crustaceans		
Natural Sciences	Organismic Biology and Ecology	Edward Novitski		Genetic effect of ultra-high frequency irradation	Also won in 1974	
Natural Sciences	Plant Science	Carlos E. Chardón	Tropical Agriculture Institute			
Natural Sciences	Plant Science	Aaron John Sharp	University of Tennessee	Correlations between plants of the Southern Appalachians and the temperate floras of the mountains and highlands of Mexico and Central America	Also won in 1944	
Social Science	Economics	Leonid Hurwicz	University of Chicago			
Social Science	Economics	Mabel F. Timlin	University of Saskatchewan	Welfare economics		
Social Science	Psychology	George L. Kreezer	Cornell University (visiting)	Mathematical analysis of physiological regulatory systems on the basis of physical automatic control theory	Also won in 1947	
Social Science	Psychology	Theodore Christian Schneirla	New York University; American Museum of Natural History	Relationship between instinct and learning in insect psychology	Also won in 1944	
Social Science	Sociology	Charles Wright Mills	University of Maryland	White Collar: The American Middle Classes (published 1951)		

== 1945 Latin American and Caribbean Fellows ==
Category	Field of Study	Fellow	Institutional association	Research topic	Notes	Ref
Creative Arts	Fine Arts	José Alonso			Also won in 1946	
Creative Arts	Fine Arts	Mauricio Lasansky			Also won in 1943, 1944, 1953, 1964	
Creative Arts	Fine Arts	Jesús Escobedo Trejo				
Creative Arts	Music Composition	Juan A. Orrego-Salas			Also won in 1954	
Humanities	Geography and Environmental Studies	Gerardo A. Canet	Institute of La Víbora, Havana		Also won in 1947	
Humanities	Iberian and Latin American History	Ramón Iglesia	El Colegio de México	Mexican historiography in the 16th century	Also won in 1943	
Humanities	Linguistics	John Corominas	National University of Cuyo		Also won in 1948, 1957	
Natural Sciences	Astronomy and Astrophysics	Félix Cernuschi	National University of Tucumán		Also won in 1942	
Natural Sciences	Astronomy and Astrophysics	Guido Münch Paniagua	University of Chicago (PhD student)		Also won in 1944, 1958	
Natural Sciences	Astronomy and Astrophysics	Carlos Ulrrico Cesco	La Plata Astronomical Observatory			
Natural Sciences	Mathematics	Rafael Laguardia	University of the Republic (Uruguay)			
Natural Sciences	Medicine and Health	Eduardo Aguirre Pequeño				
Natural Sciences	Medicine and Health	José Jesús Estable	Instituto de Medicina Experimental		Also won in 1947	
Natural Sciences	Medicine and Health	Alfonso Graña	University of the Republic			
Natural Sciences	Molecular and Cellular Biology	Otto Guilherme Bier	Biological Institute (São Paulo)		Also won in 1941, 1946	
Natural Sciences	Organismic Biology and Ecology	Manuel Maldonado Koerdell	Autonomous University of Nuevo León	Comparative anatomy, especially of the vertebrate skeleton	Also won in 1944	
Natural Sciences	Organismic Biology and Ecology	Luis René Rivas y Díaz	La Salle College		Also won in 1946	
Natural Sciences	Organismic Biology and Ecology	Bernardo Villa Ramírez	National Autonomous University of Mexico		Also won in 1946	
Natural Sciences	Plant Science	Sigurd Arentsen Steeger	Ministry of Agriculture (Chile)			
Natural Sciences	Plant Science	Elisa Hirschhorn	University of La Plata	Plant pathology	Also won in 1944	
Social Science	Economics	Raúl García	National University of Córdoba	Agrarian policy in the United States	Also won in 1943	

== See also ==
- Guggenheim Fellowship
- List of Guggenheim Fellowships awarded in 1944
- List of Guggenheim Fellowships awarded in 1946
