= Frederick A. Pottle =

American literary scholar

Frederick Albert Pottle (1897–1987) was an American literary scholar, biographer, and editor who was one of the world's foremost scholars on James Boswell. From 1929 to 1979 he was the editor of the Boswell Papers at Yale University. As editor, he studied the extensive writings of James Boswell; including the author's diaries, correspondences and papers, to compile a detailed account of his life. Pottle's 1966 biography of Boswell, James Boswell: The Earlier Years, 1740-1769 was a finalist for the National Book Award (in the Arts and Letters category). The first volume of the Boswell papers edited by Pottle, Boswell's London Journal: 1762-1763 was well received academically and was widely popular amongst the general public. The volume sold more than 1 million copies worldwide, and was translated into multiple languages.

== Biography ==
Pottle was born in Maine on 3 August 1897 to Fred Leroy and Annette Kemp Pottle. He completed his primary education in a one-room schoolhouse in Maine. Pottle served as a surgical assistant during World War I at evacuation hospitals to the rear of the front-lines in Germany and France. He returned to the United States where he earned a degree in English from Colby College in 1917. He then studied literature at Yale, earning a master's degree and a PhD. During his graduate studies, for two years, Pottle was an English professor at the University of New Hampshire.

Pottle's 1923 book explored how the writings of Percy Bysshe Shelley influenced the early career of English poet and playwright Robert Browning. Pottle had analyzed Shelley's works to explain how they had influenced the young Browning, with his academic scholarship drawing parallels between the two author's writings. The book was reprinted in 1965 and was considered one of the authoritative texts on Browning.

Pottle's 1927 book A New Portrait of James Boswell examined the provenance of a 1765 portrait of James Boswell, tracing the origin of the painting to the Scottish painter George Willison.

Working with Chauncey Brewster Tinker, his doctoral advisor at Yale, Pottle expanded his scholarship of the writings of James Boswell. His PhD thesis, in which he examined Boswell's bibliography and its publication history, was greatly modified and published in 1929 as The Literary Career of James Boswell Esq (written with Tinker). The Poetry Foundation stated that the book was "the most authoritative work on Boswell." The thesis was awarded the John Addison Porter Prize at Yale.

Pottle wrote the autobiography Stretchers in 1929, which was an account of his tour of duty with the US Army as a surgical assistant in an evacuation hospital behind the Western Front in World War I from 1917 to 1919.

In 1929 Pottle became the editor of the Boswell Papers. At the time, the extensive collection of personal writings from prolific author James Boswell had been in the hands of private collector Ralph Heyward Isham with Geoffrey Scott serving as editor. The Boswell Project was tasked with editing the papers and releasing them in volumes to the general public and academia. At the time of Scott's death, a letter of congratulations to Pottle was found in one of his jacket pockets. The collection was noted to be in disarray upon Pottle's start as editor.

In 1930, Pottle completed volumes 7 to 12 of the Boswell Papers, working daily analysing and curating the writings, whilst also teaching as an English professor at Yale. Portions of the Boswell Papers were exhibited to The Grolier Club in New York City in 1930, with one volume (Boswell's Private Papers from Malahide Castle) being presented to the literary club in paperback form.

From 1932 to 1934 Pottle edited volumes 13 to 18 of the Boswell Papers, using photostat (photocopied) images to study the primary material at his Yale offices remotely (the collection was then housed at the New York City Public Library).

Pottle's 1937 book, Boswell and the Girl from Botany Bay, details how Boswell had advocated the pardon of British convict Mary Bryant who had been exiled to Australia, and had married another convict and had two children. Boswell had personally met Bryant, and he used some of his on finances and advocated her pardon along with that of her family, and four other convicts.

In 1941, Pottle wrote the book The Idiom of Poetry in which he synthesized and promoted a critical evaluation of poetry that takes into account the social milieu in which the works were created. The book was based on Pottles previous lectures at Colby College and Cornell University.

In 1944 Pottle became The Sterling Professor of English at Yale (with a Sterling Professorship being one of the highest academic honors at the university). He was awarded two Guggenheim Fellowships in 1945 and 1952 to support his scholarly studies of Boswell. Trade editions (books that were oriented to the general public) of the Boswell papers were published starting in 1950 with Boswell's London Journal, 1762-1763, Boswell in Holland, 1763-1764 (1952), and Boswell on the Grand Tour: Germany and Switzerland, 1764 (1953). The first of these volumes was widely popular, selling over 1 million copies globally and being translated into multiple languages Danish, Swedish, Finnish, French, Italian and German.

Pottle's biography of Boswell, James Boswell: The Early Years, 1740-1769, was lauded by the Poetry Foundation for letting the subject (Boswell) speak for himself. It included a translation of a letter that Boswell had written to introduce himself to philosopher Jean-Jacques Rousseau, in which intimate details of Boswell's motivations and beliefs were explored by Pottle. The Poetry Foundation stated that three overarching themes in Pottle's biography of Boswell were: exploring Boswell's connections to his family, his training and career growth in his trade as a lawyer, and the exploration and analysis of his writings. Reviewing the biography in The New York Times, Thomas Lask stated: "the biography justifies itself because Boswell is so alive in it", with Lask commending the biography for portraying Boswell's varying, inconsistent morality and behaviours with nuance.

The Poetry Foundation noted that Pottle's lifelong scholarship of Boswell had greatly elevated the standing of the author, replacing the 19th century critical standing of the author as an "idler"; a man known mostly for his biography Life of Samuel Johnson LL. D, whose other works were discounted.

Part 2 of the biography, James Boswell: The Later Years, 1769-1795 was in early development, but Pottle relinquished control of the project to Frank Brady who wrote the book, publishing it in 1984.

Pottle's 1982 book Pride and Negligence: The History of the Boswell Papers was partly autobiographical, and detailed Pottle's lifelong scholarship of the collection. It also traces the provenance of the collection as it passed from descendants of Boswell in the 18th and 19th centuries, to private collectors, to Yale University in 1949.

Pottle retired from the editorial committee of the Boswell Papers in 1979, but he continued to work on the project until 1984. He was the Chancellor of the Academy of American Poets from 1950 to 1960, a member of the American Academy of Arts and Sciences, and a Fellow of the International Institute of Arts and Letters. He edited 13 volumes of the Boswell Papers.

He was married to Marion Isabel Starbird, a trained librarian who often assisted with his scholarly work on the Boswell Papers. He had 3 children: his daughter Annette died in infancy, his son Sam Pottle was a well known musician and composer, and his son Christopher is a professor of engineering at Cornell University.
