= Seymour S. Cohen =

American biochemist

Seymour Stanley Cohen (April 30, 1917-December 30, 2018) was an American biochemist. Cohen was born in Brooklyn, New York in April 1917. He attended City College of New York and his PhD came from Columbia University under the supervision of Erwin Chargaff. In the 1940s he worked on plant viruses and for the Rockefeller Institute. He was awarded a Guggenheim Fellowship in 1945. He is known by his studies with marked of radioactive isotopes, whose results suggested an essential role of DNA in hereditary genetic material. This result would be checked in 1952 by Hershey and Chase.

== Bibliography ==
- Bessman, Maurice J. (9 May 1969). "Virus-Induced Enzymes, Seymour S. Cohen". Science. 164 (3880): 680–681. doi:10.1126/science.164.3880.680-a. ISSN 0036-8075.
- Kresge, Nicole; Simoni, Robert D.; Hill, Robert L. (28 September 2007). "Novel Metabolic Pathways in Virus Infection: the Work of Seymour Cohen". The Journal of Biological Chemistry. 282 (39). The American Society for Biochemistry and Molecular Biology: 31–32. ISSN 1083-351X.
- Olby, Robert (2013). The Path to the Double Helix: The Discovery of DNA. Courier Corporation. ISBN 9780486166599.
- Pegg, Anthony And (September 1998). "An encyclopedia of polyamines". Trends in Biochemical Sciences. 23 (9): 366–367. doi:10.1016/s0968-0004(98)01275-4. ISSN 0968-0004.
- Stevens, Lewis (September 1972). "Introduction to the Polyamines, by Seymour S. Cohen". The Quarterly Review of Biology. 47 (3). University of Chicago Press: 333–335. doi:10.1086/407350. ISSN 0033-5770. JSTOR 2821134.
- Tabor, Herbert; Tabor, Celia White (1999). "A Guide to the Polyamines, Seymour S. Cohen". Analytical Biochemistry. 274 (1): 150. doi:10.1006/abio.1999.4227.

Tertiary sources

- Daintith, John; Gjertsen, Derek, eds. (1999). A Dictionary of Scientists. Oxford University Press. ISBN 9780192800862.
- Biographical Encyclopedia of Scientists, Second Edition - 2 Volume Set (2ª ed.). CRC Press. 1994. ISBN 9780750302876.
