= Sculpture in Mexico =

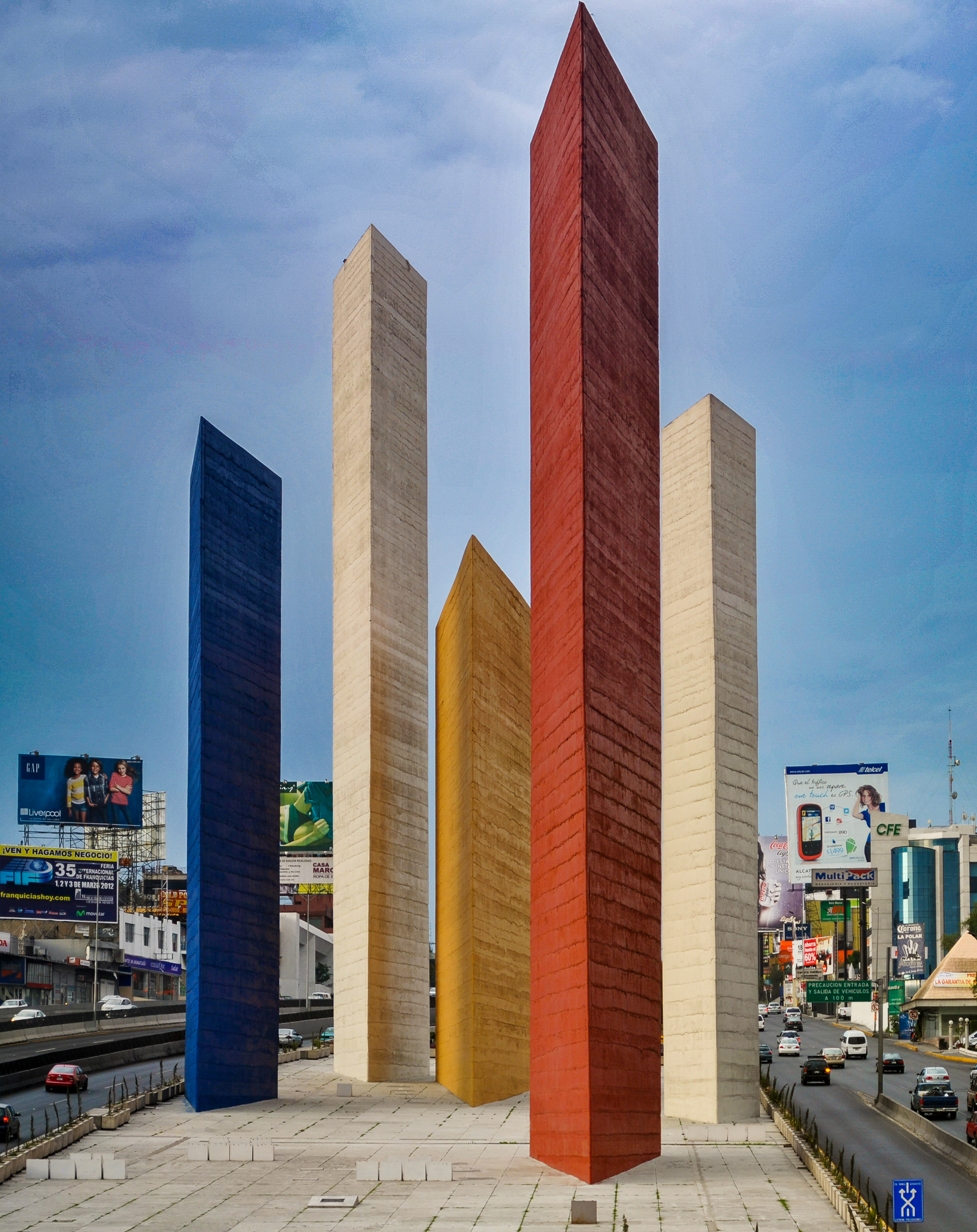
Torres de Satélite

Sculpture stands as one of the most ancient and revered artistic traditions within the cultural tapestry of Mexico. Its origins trace back to Prehispanic civilizations, where it found expression in a myriad of forms across diverse contexts, including pyramids, sanctuaries, esplanades, and communal objects. The civilizations of Olmec, Maya, Teotihuacan, Tarascan, Mixtec, and Aztec each contributed distinctive sculptural styles and motifs, leaving an indelible mark on Mexico's artistic legacy. The Olmec civilization, renowned as the "Mother Culture" of Mesoamerica, crafted imposing stone sculptures characterized by their enigmatic colossal heads, believed to represent deities or rulers. These monumental sculptures, often weighing several tons, exemplify the Olmec's mastery of sculptural form and their profound spiritual beliefs.

Similarly, the Tarascan, Mixtec, and Aztec civilizations left enduring legacies in sculpture, producing works of remarkable craftsmanship and artistic sophistication. Aztec sculpture, in particular, is celebrated for its dynamic compositions and symbolic richness, with iconic examples such as the Coatlicue statue and the Calendar Stone showcasing the civilization's mastery of form and symbolism. The city of Teotihuacan, with its monumental pyramids and urban layout, featured sculptural reliefs and statues depicting gods, animals, and celestial bodies. These sculptures adorned the facades of temples and palaces, serving as expressions of Teotihuacan's cosmology and religious beliefs.

== By century ==
=== 16th and 17th centuries ===
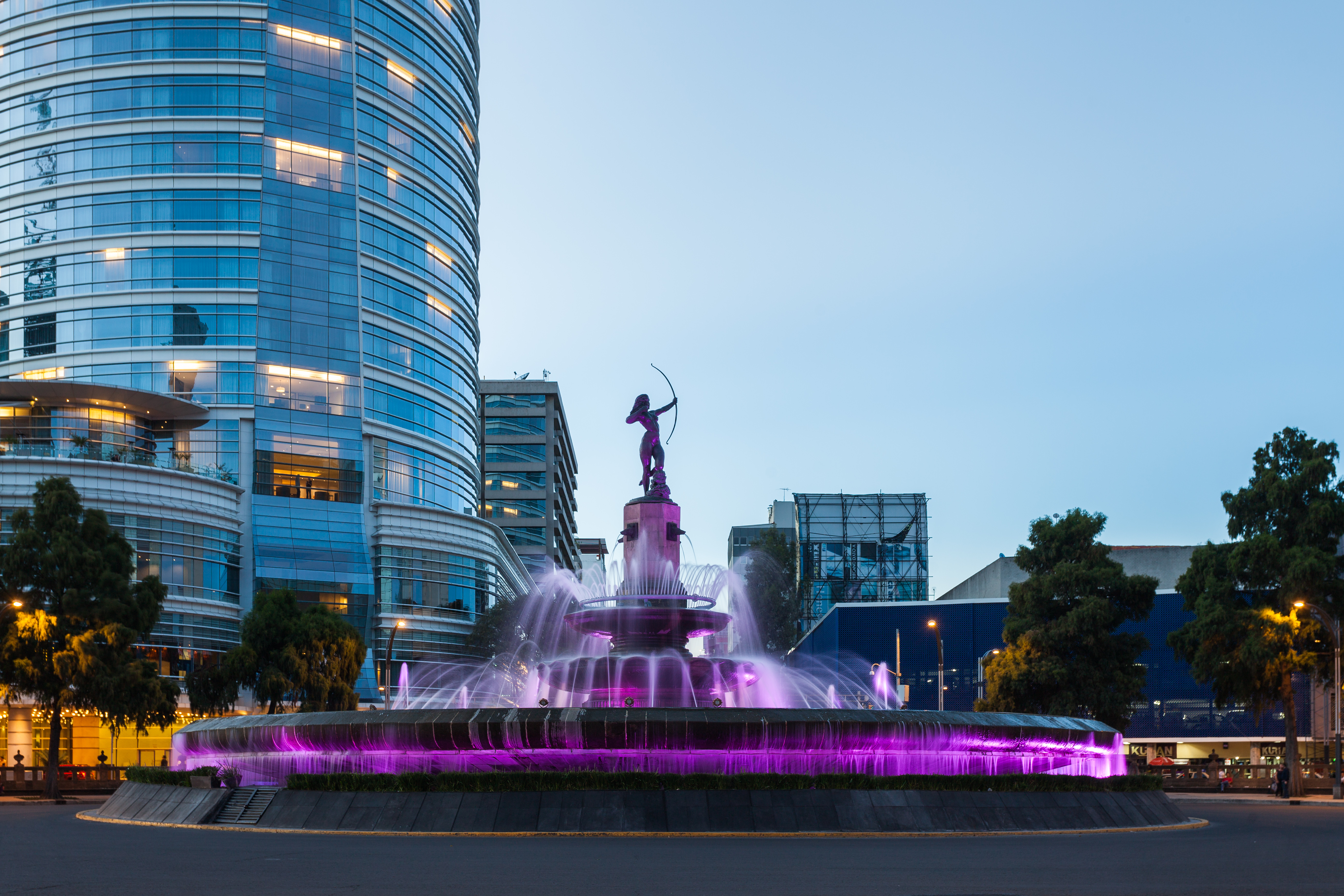
Diana the Huntress Fountain

In the aftermath of the conquest of Mexico, the evolution of sculpture can be delineated into two distinct categories: decorative and statuary. Employing materials such as stone or wood, artisans of the era crafted works that reflected both the artistic traditions of the indigenous cultures and the influences of European styles brought by the conquistadors. During the colonial era, the Plateresque style emerged as a dominant artistic movement, characterized by its intricate ornamentation and sculptural richness. Plateresque art, which drew inspiration from Spanish Renaissance and Mannerist aesthetics, manifested primarily in architectural sculpture and altarpiece design. Notable examples of Plateresque altarpieces, adorned with elaborate sculptural elements and intricate relief work, can be found in churches and cathedrals throughout colonial Mexico.

In the cathedral of Mexico, work Claudio Arciniega and Juan Miguel Agüero. It will become the paradigm of colonial architecture. Francisco Becerra will raise the cathedral of Puebla. Francisco Antonio Guerrero y Torres: Chapel of the Pocito, in the Villa de Guadalupe. In Puebla, a very active baroque school appears. Sanctuaries of Ocotlán in Tlaxcala, and of San Francisco de Acatepec, two magnificent examples of the Novohispano Baroque.

In all the colonial cities, fine finishes in the ornamentation and the facades of the churches can be appreciated. Oaxaca and its numerous temples like Soledad and Santo Domingo show the beauty and magnificence of it.

=== 18th century ===
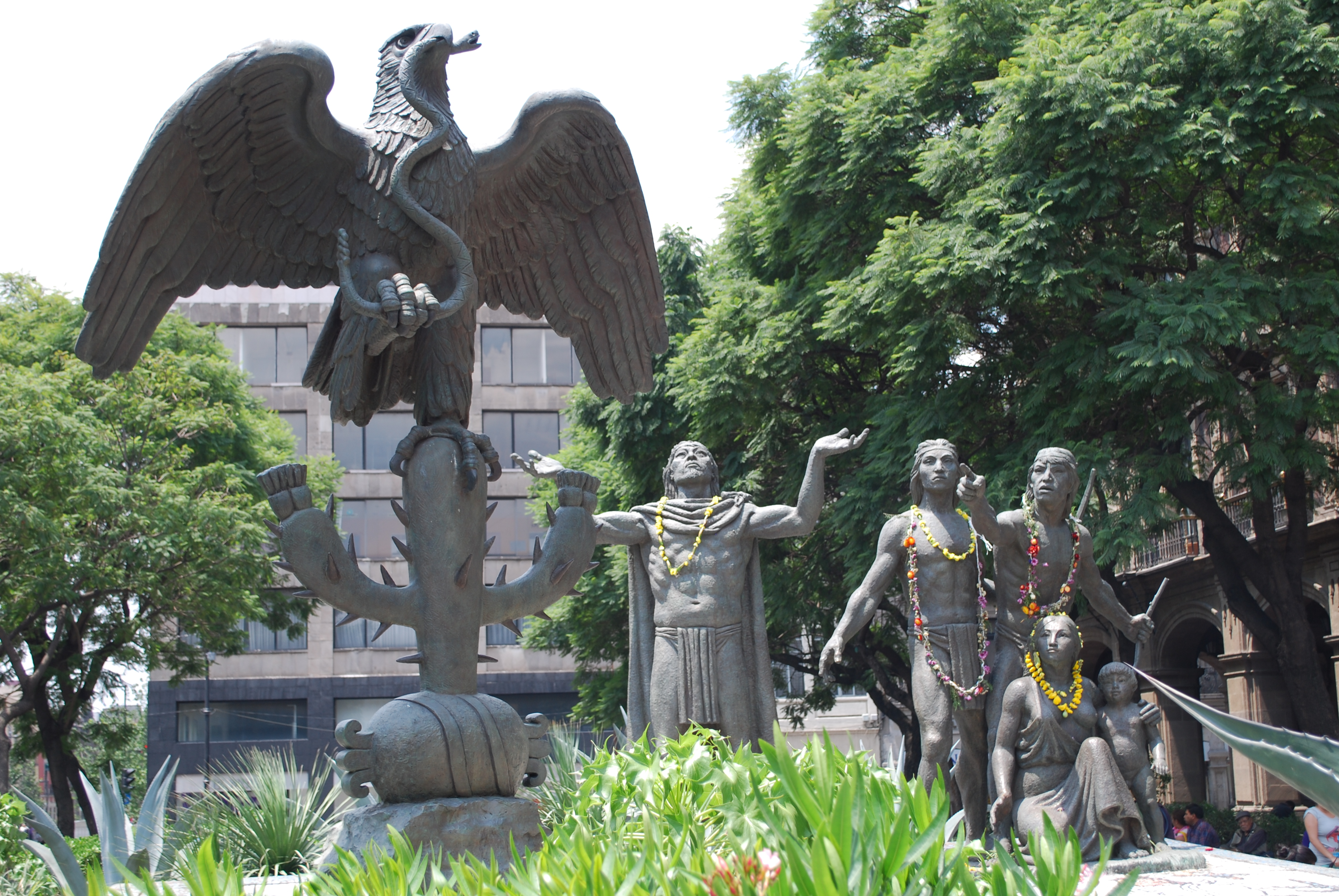
Monumento de la Fundación de México-Tenochtitlan (Monument of the Foundation of Mexico)

The establishment of academies across Europe during the 17th century marked a pivotal transition from religious dogma to rational inquiry within the realm of artistic expression. Departing from the dominant religious paradigm that characterized preceding centuries, these academies heralded a new era of artistic exploration grounded in reason and intellectual inquiry. In New Spain, this philosophical shift precipitated a notable reaction against the ornate excesses of the baroque style, particularly evident in the realm of sculpture.

During this period, altarpieces characterized by their sculptural intricacy were deemed excessive and overtly ornamental, prompting a movement towards architectural purity and restraint. Sculptural elements were supplanted by architectural manifestations, reflecting a desire for clarity, order, and classical proportionality in artistic composition. This departure from baroque aesthetics gave rise to a distinctive architectural style characterized by clean lines, geometric precision, and a harmonious balance of form and function.

Central to this transformative period in New Spain's artistic evolution was the influential figure of Manuel Tolsá, a Spanish-born sculptor renowned for his mastery of neoclassical principles. Tolsá's works epitomized the spirit of the age, embodying a synthesis of classical ideals with contemporary sensibilities. His sculptures and architectural designs, characterized by their elegance, symmetry, and classical restraint, exerted a profound influence on the artistic landscape of New Spain, shaping its visual language and cultural identity.

=== 19th century ===
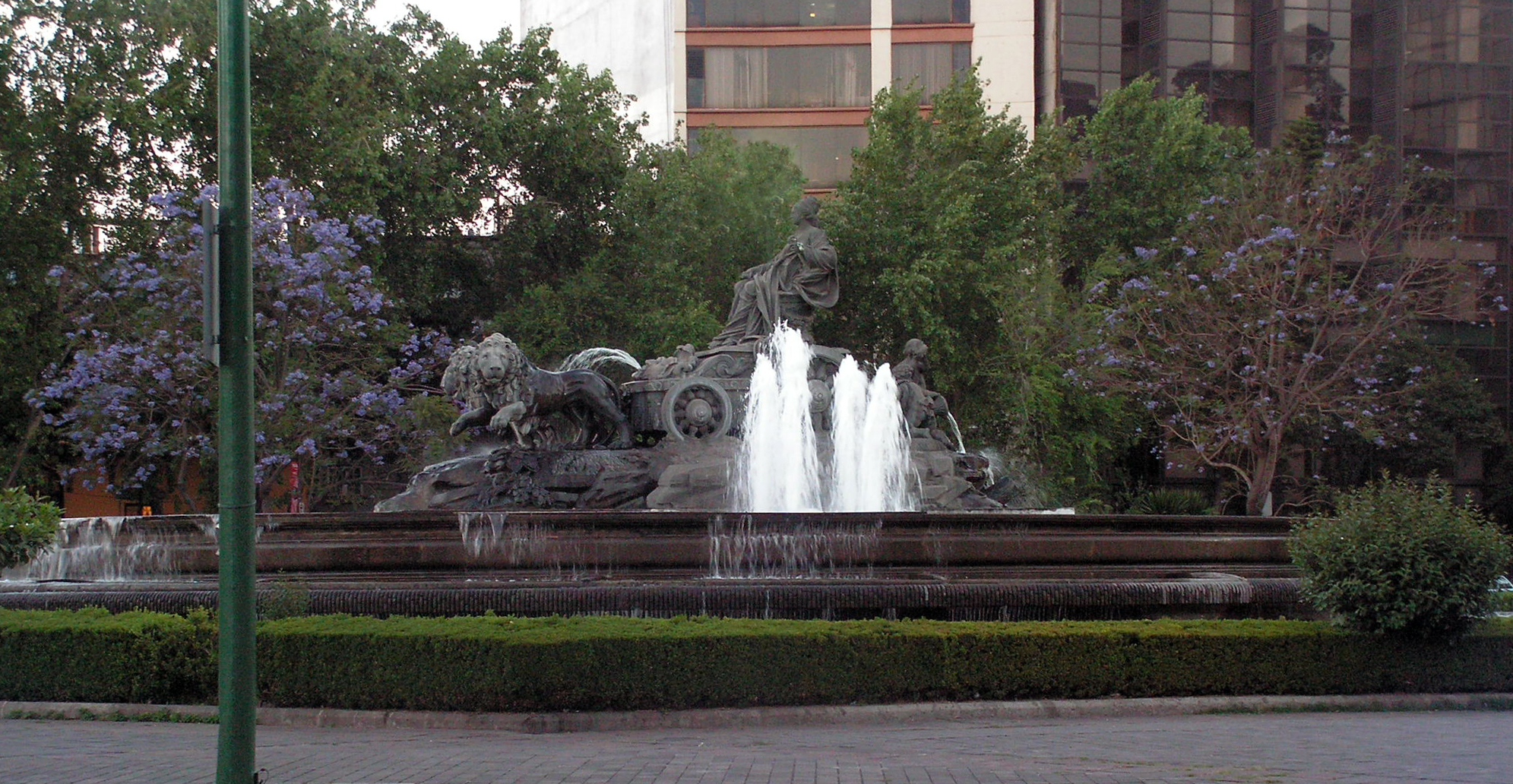
Fuente de Cibeles

Romanticism tended to break the norms and strict models of classicism, as it pursued ideas influenced by realism and nationalism. Religious sculpture was reduced to sporadic imagery, while secular sculpture continued in portraits and monumental art of a civic nature.

Between 1820 and 1880 the predominant themes were, successively: religious images, biblical scenes, allegories to the symbols of the insurgency movement and scenes and characters of pre-Cortesian history, and portraits of the old aristocracy, of the rising bourgeoisie and champions of the pre revolution. The transcendent sphere consisted in introducing civil reasons, the first national types and glimpses of a current of self-expression.

=== 20th century ===
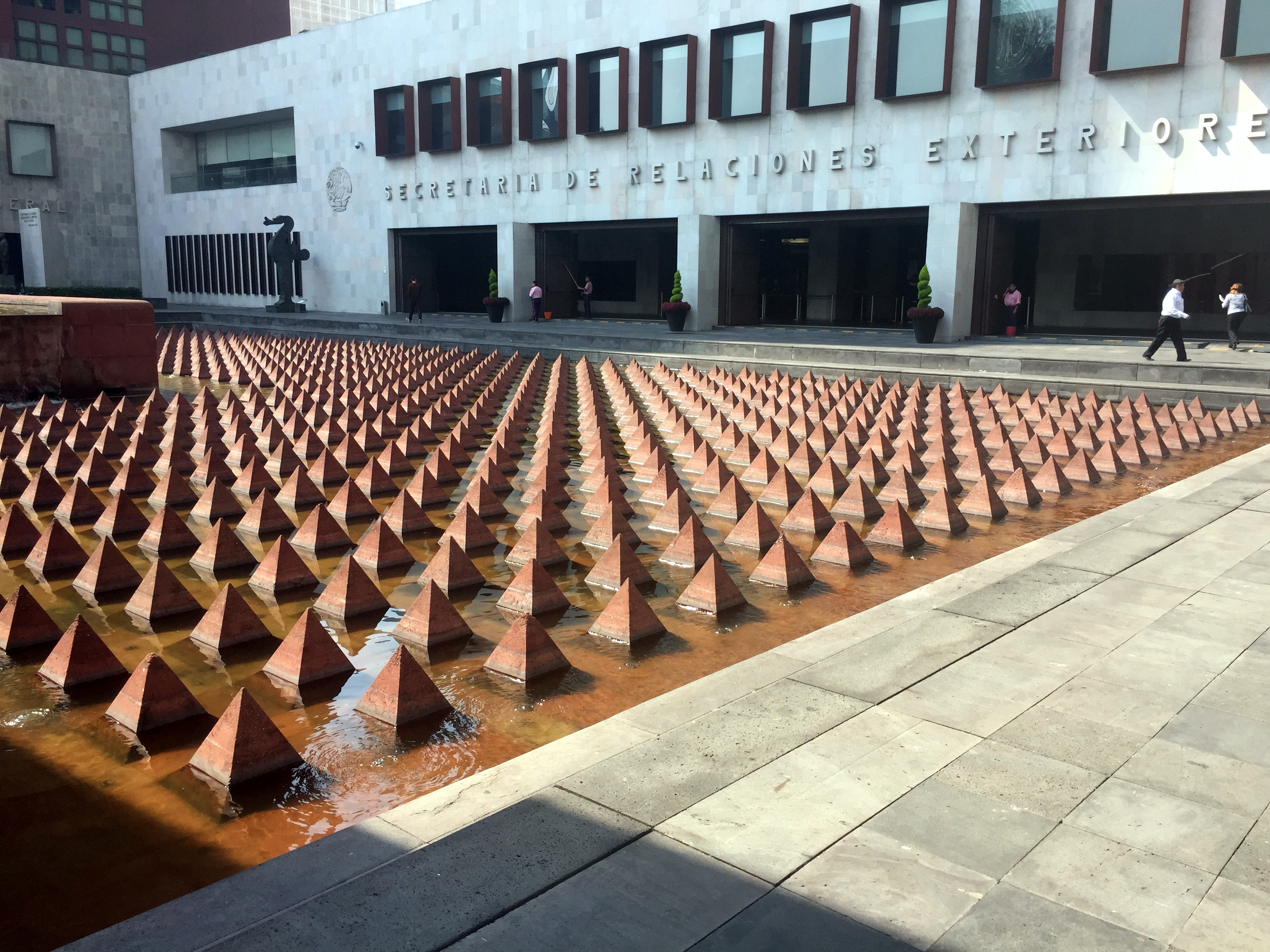
País de volcanes

Differentiated by its objectives and the emphasis of its theme, three currents emerged: an indigenist, archaic and folkloric; another, neoclassical, civic and historical; and a third, socialist, with ideological propaganda.

During the 20th century, great exponents of Mexican sculpture are Rómulo Rozo, Enrique Gottdiener Soto, Juan Soriano, José Luis Cuevas, Sebastián and Mathias Goeritz.

=== 21st century ===
During the 21st century, great exponents of Mexican sculpture are Rafael Coronel, Javier Marín, and Pedro Reyes.

== Gallery ==
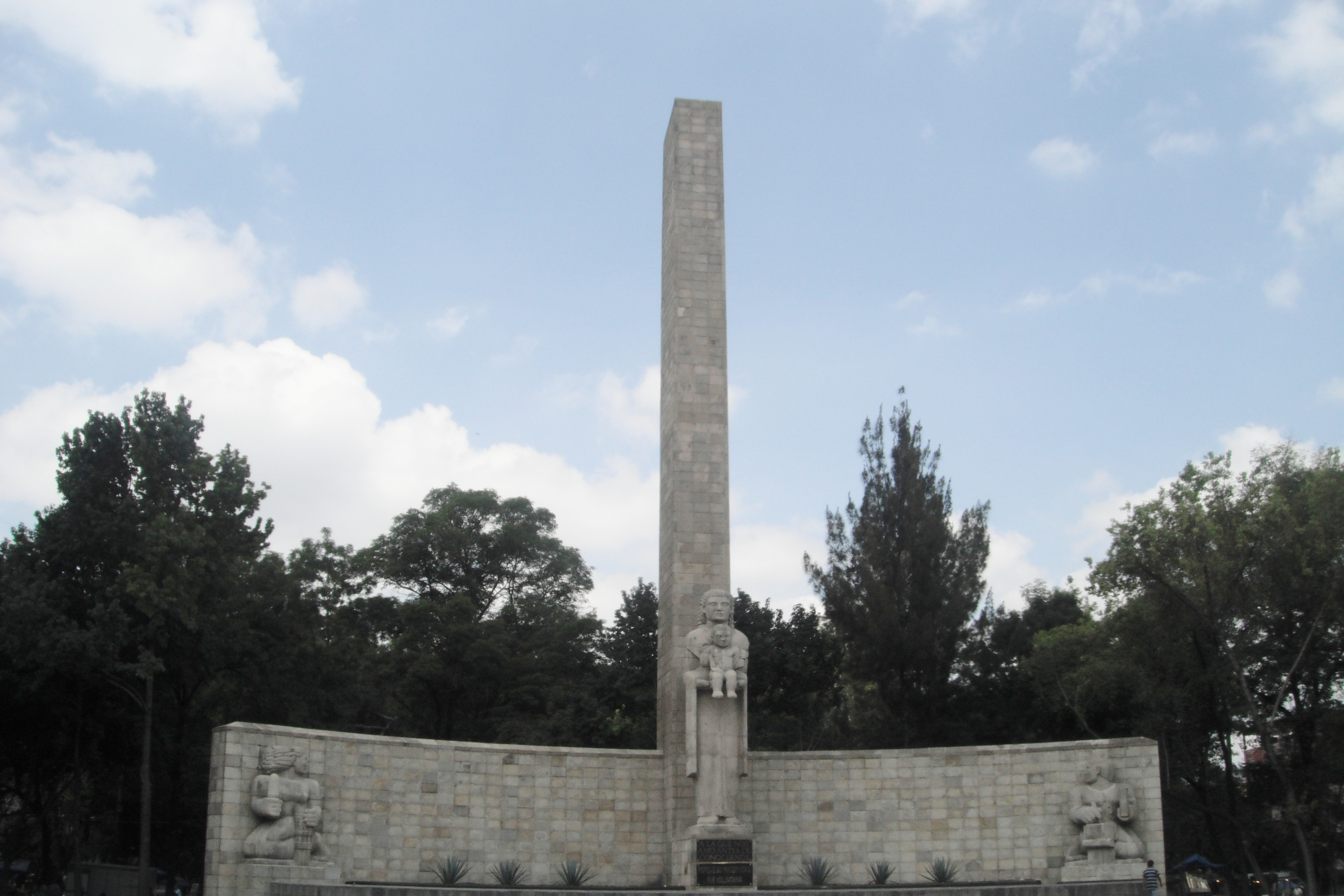
Monument to the Mother

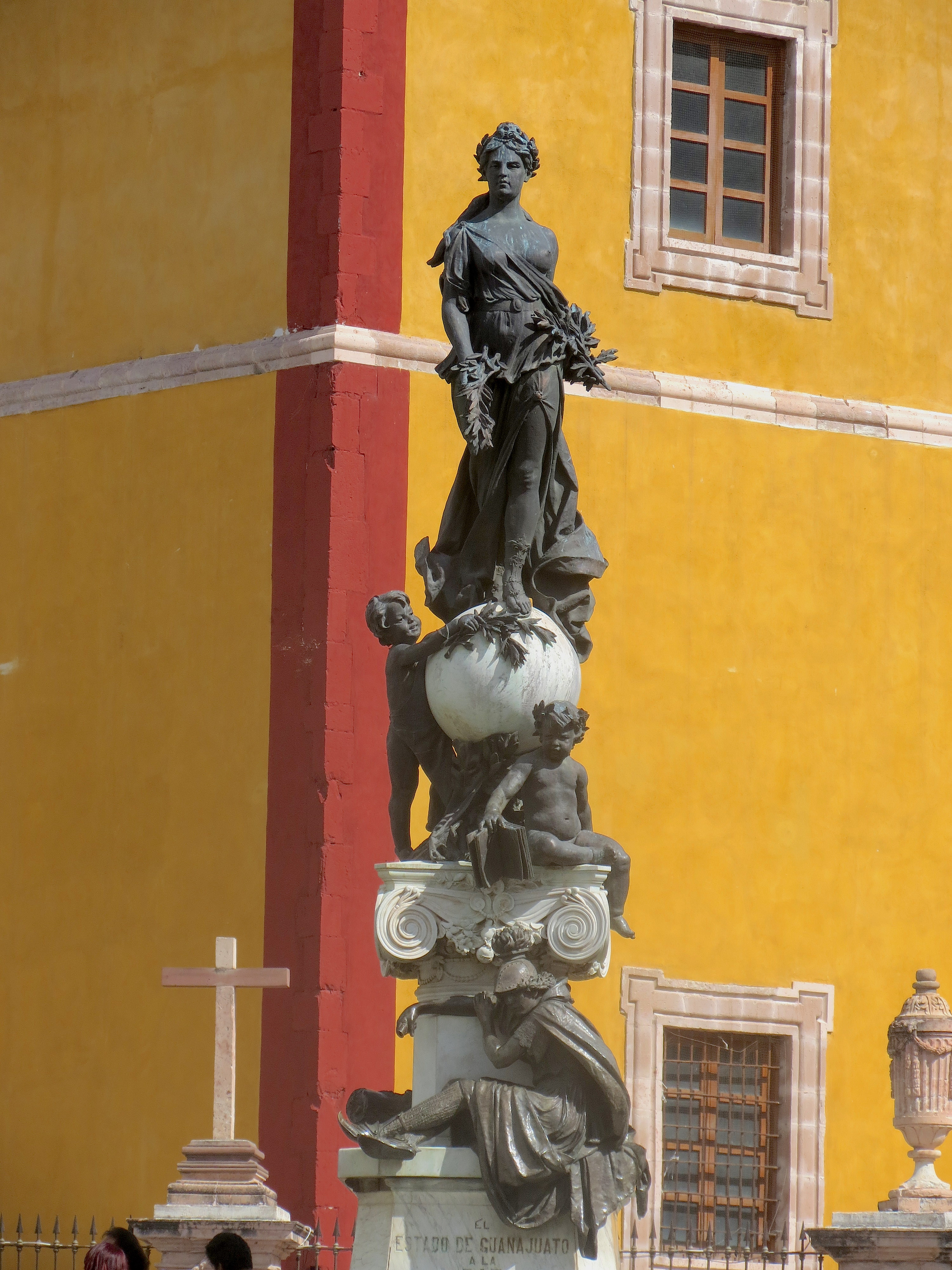
Monument to Peace in Guanajuato, Guanajuato

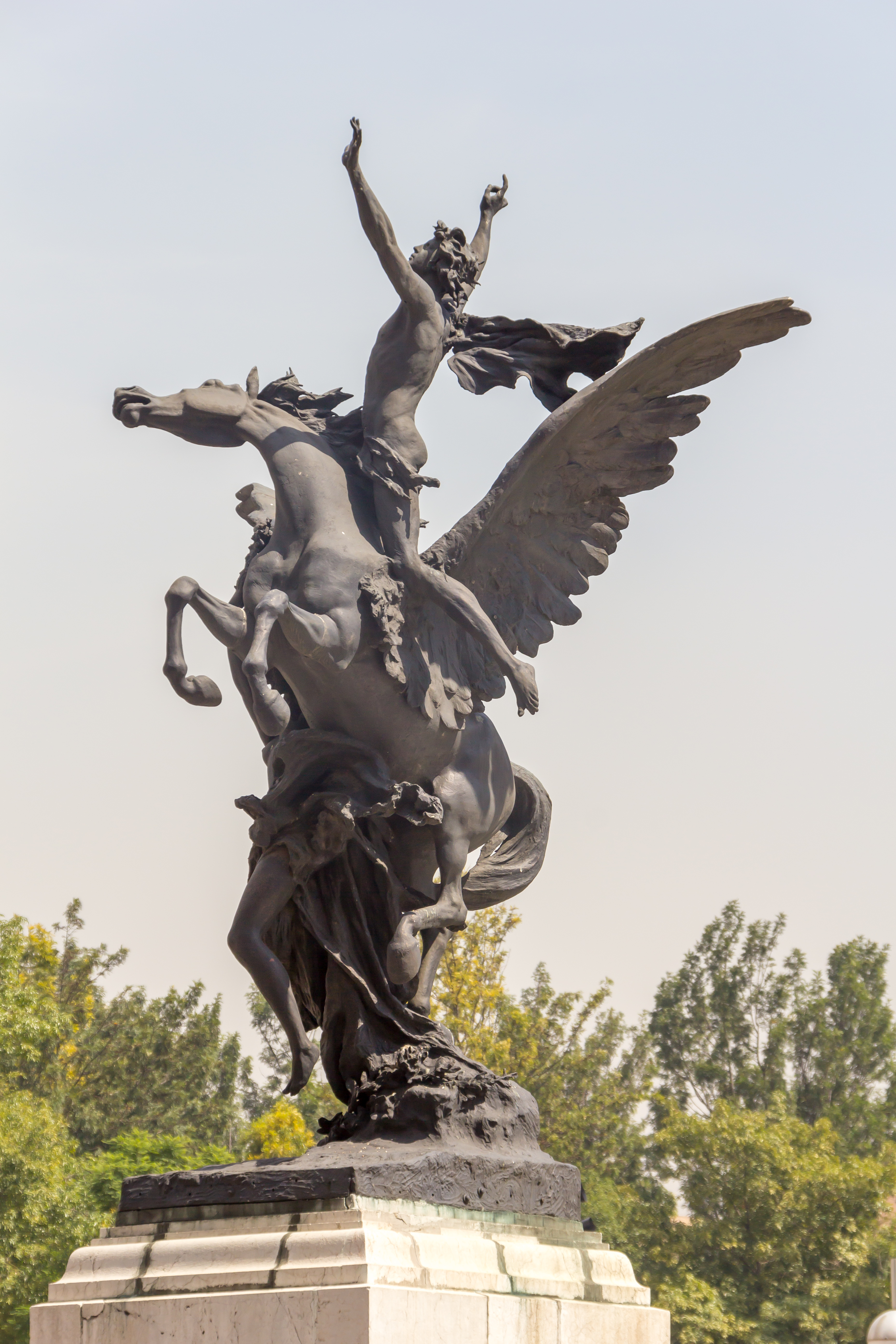
Statue of Pegasus

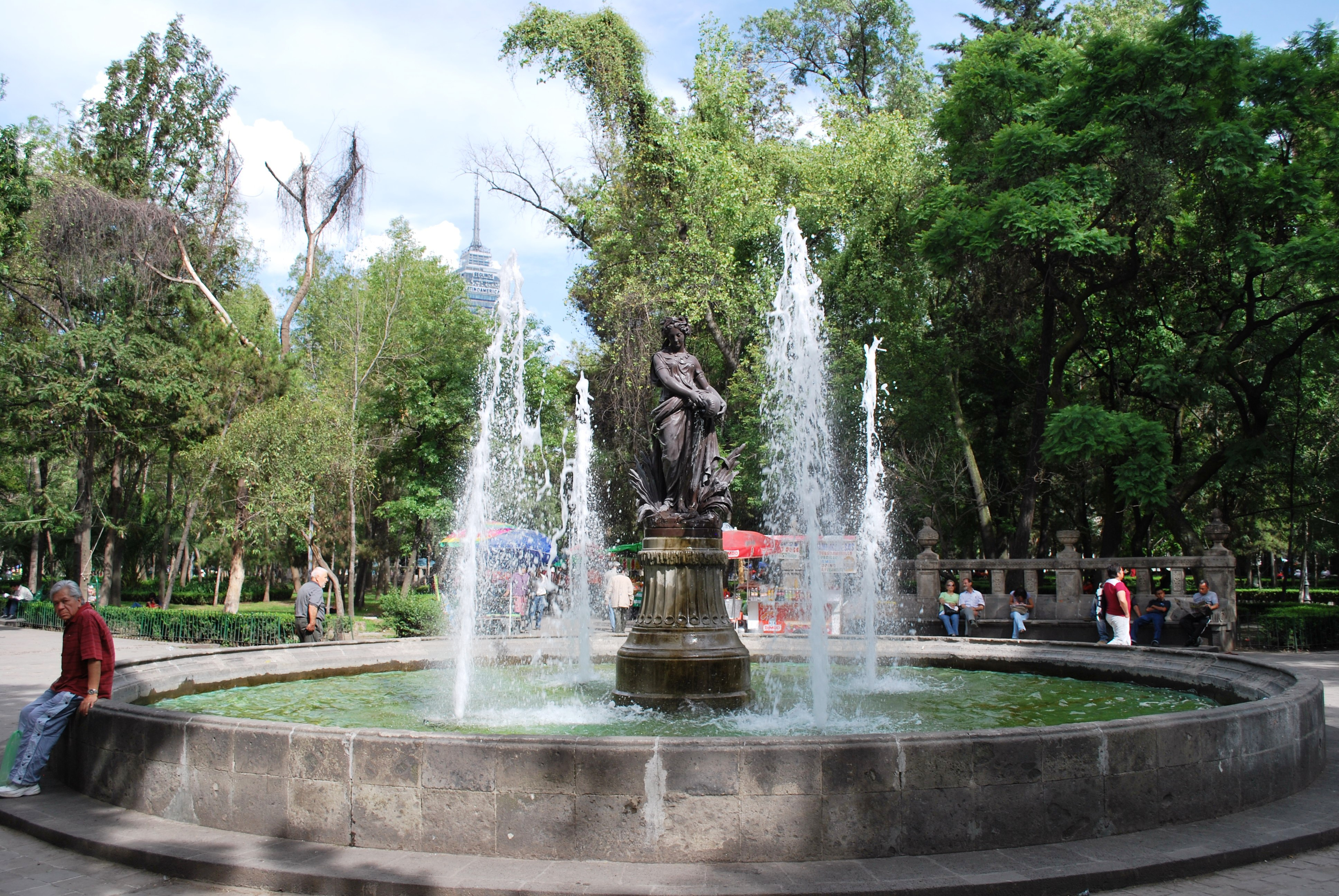
La Primavera

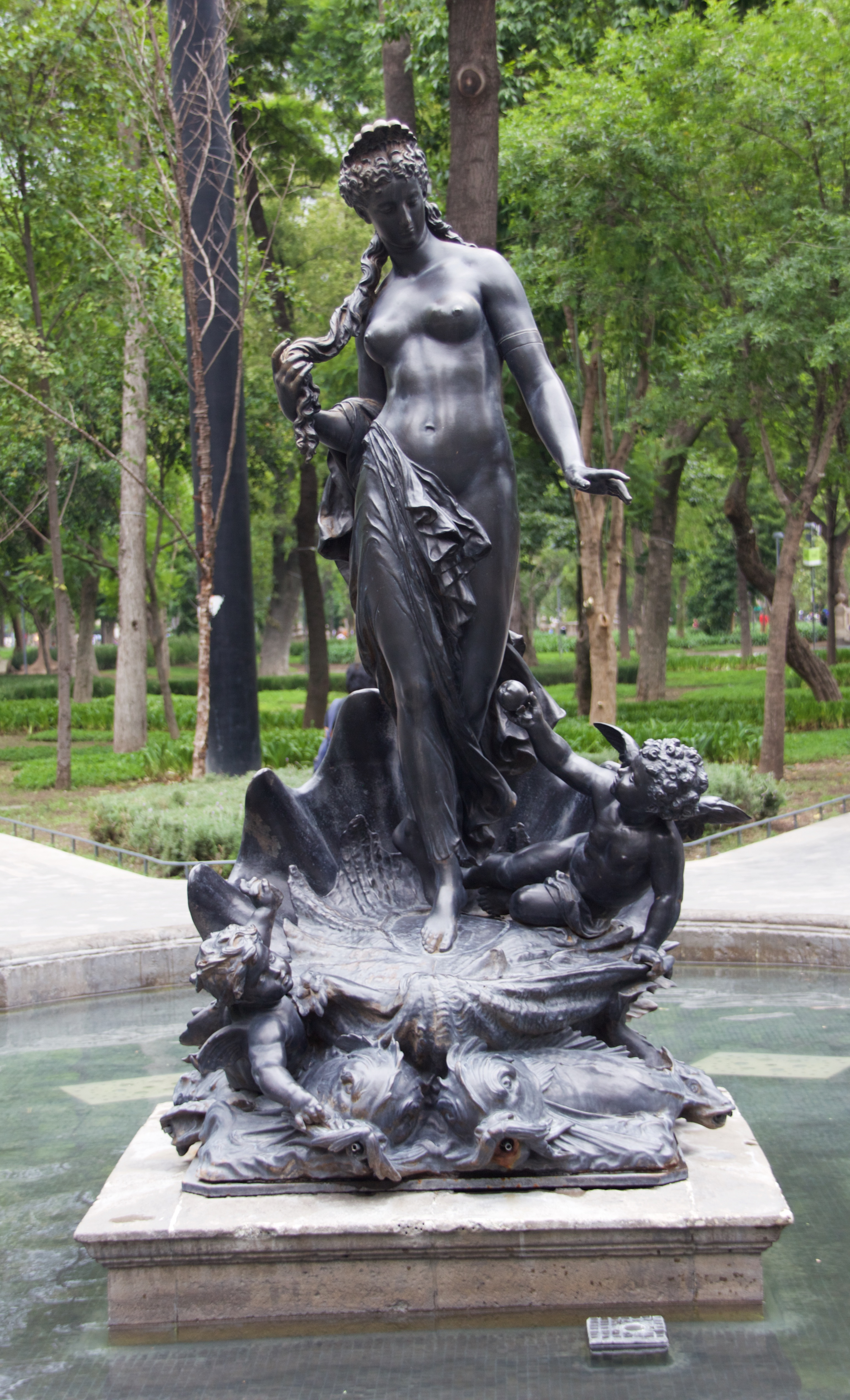
Fountain of Venus

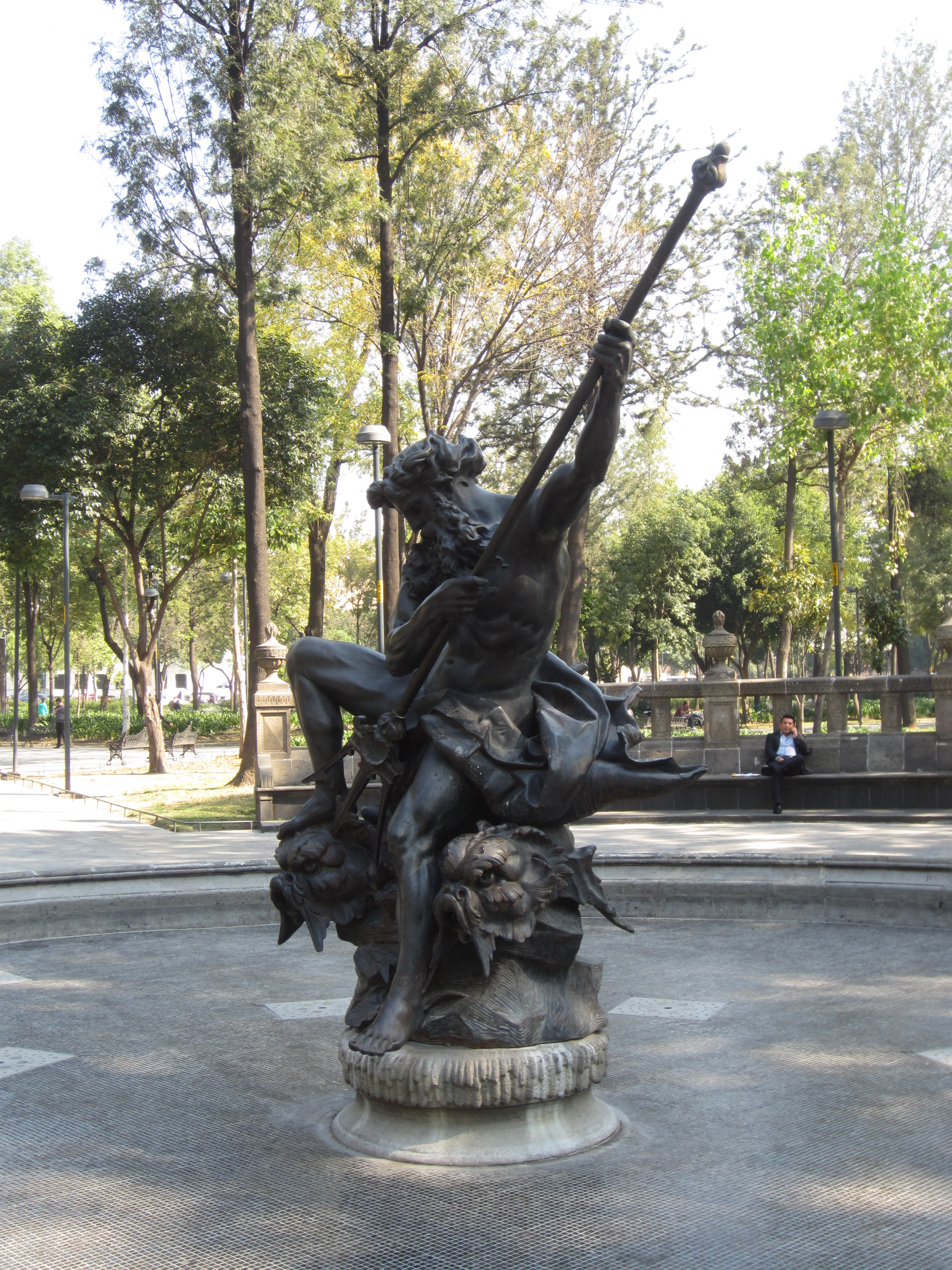
Fountain of Neptune, Mexico City

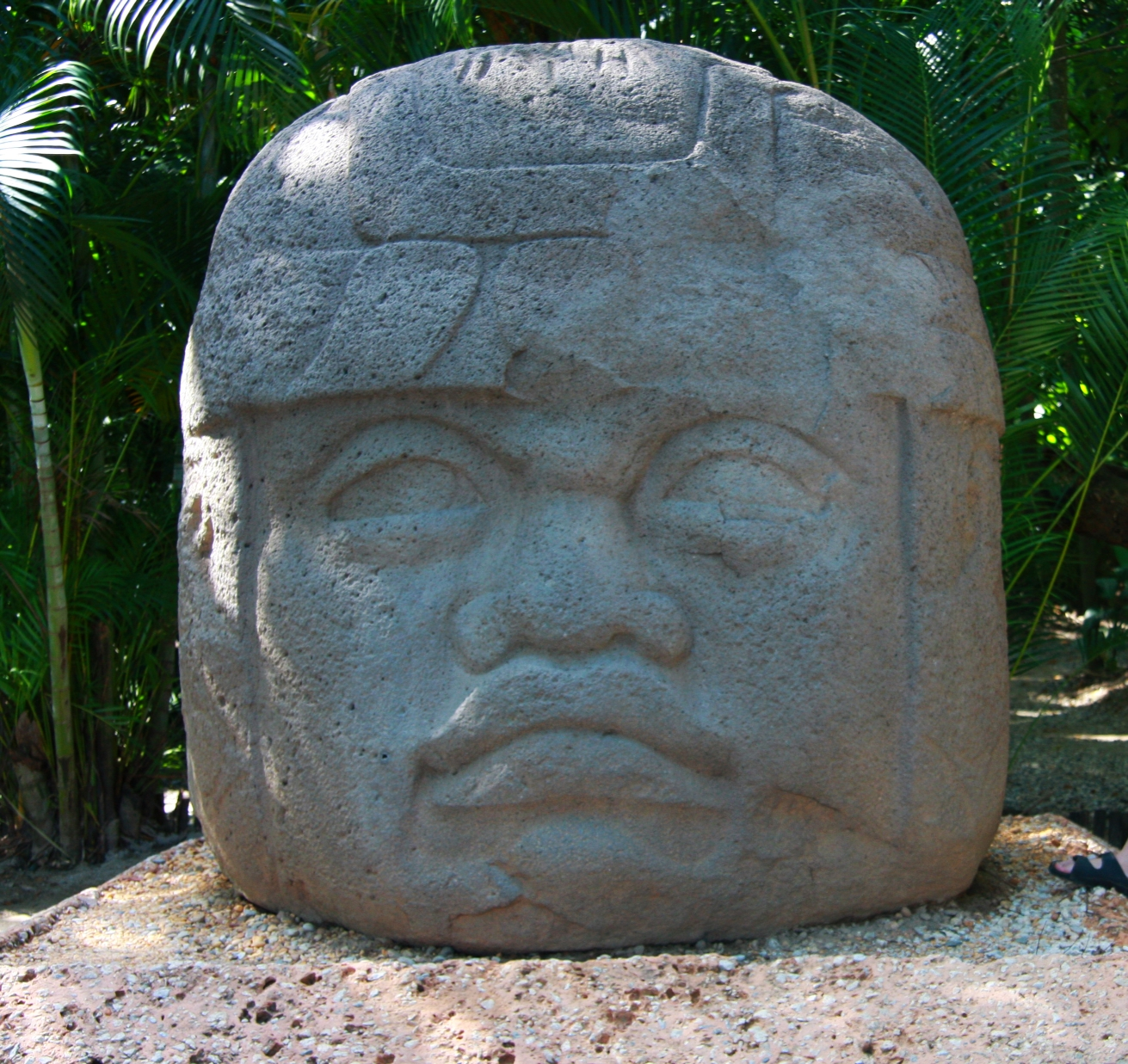
Olmec head in Villhermosa Museum

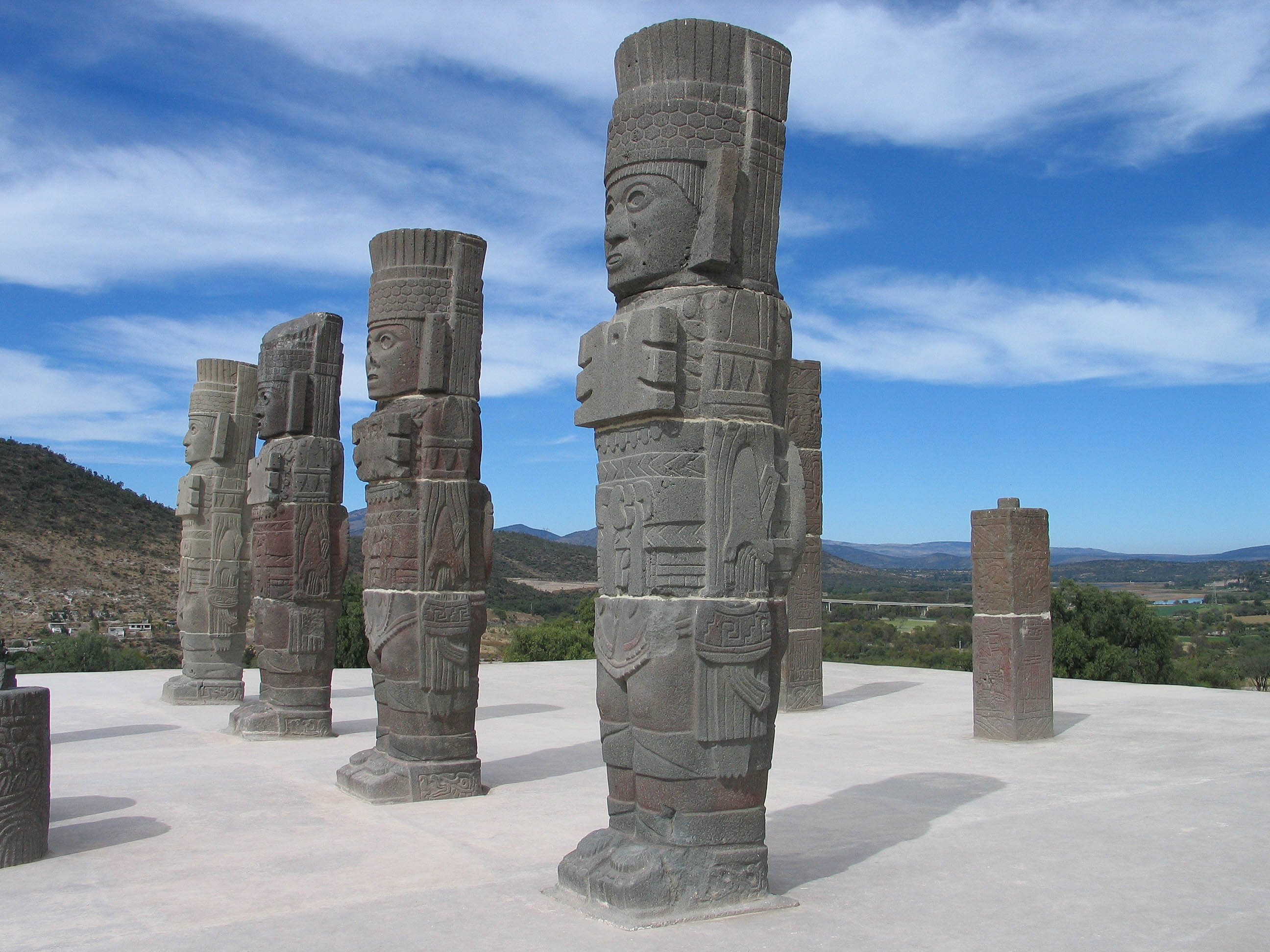
Atlantes de Tula

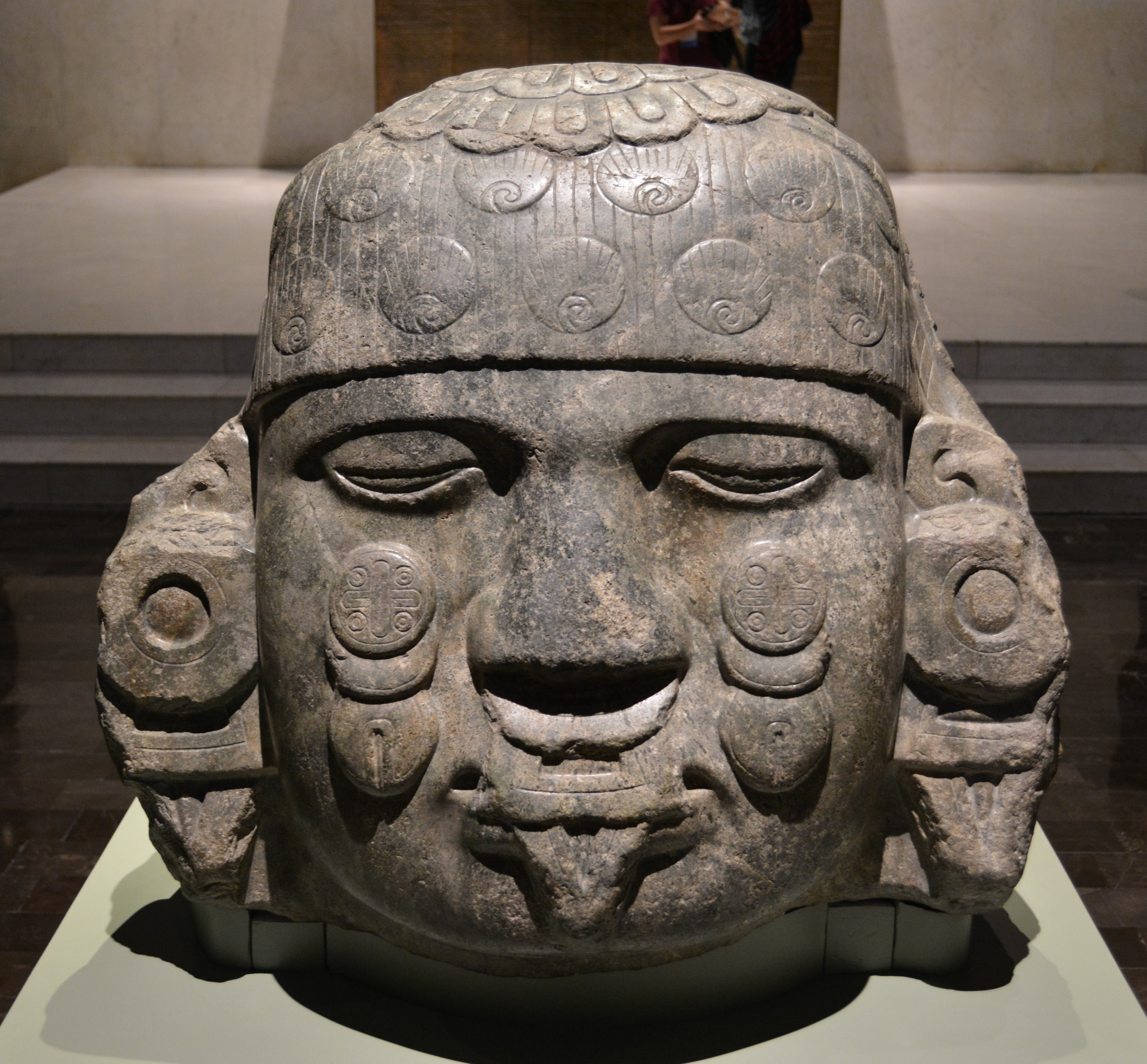
Coyolxāuhqui

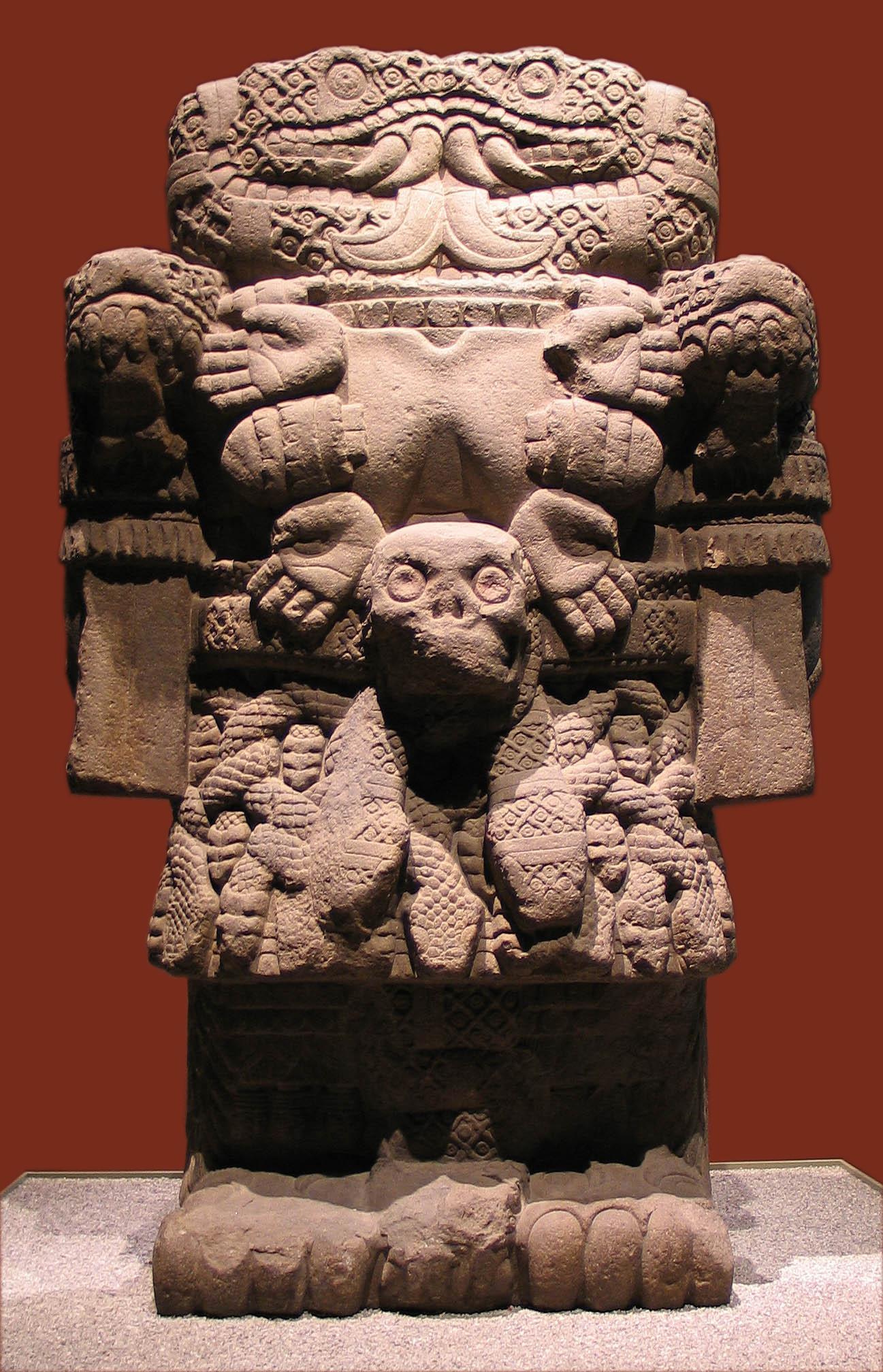
Cōātlīcue

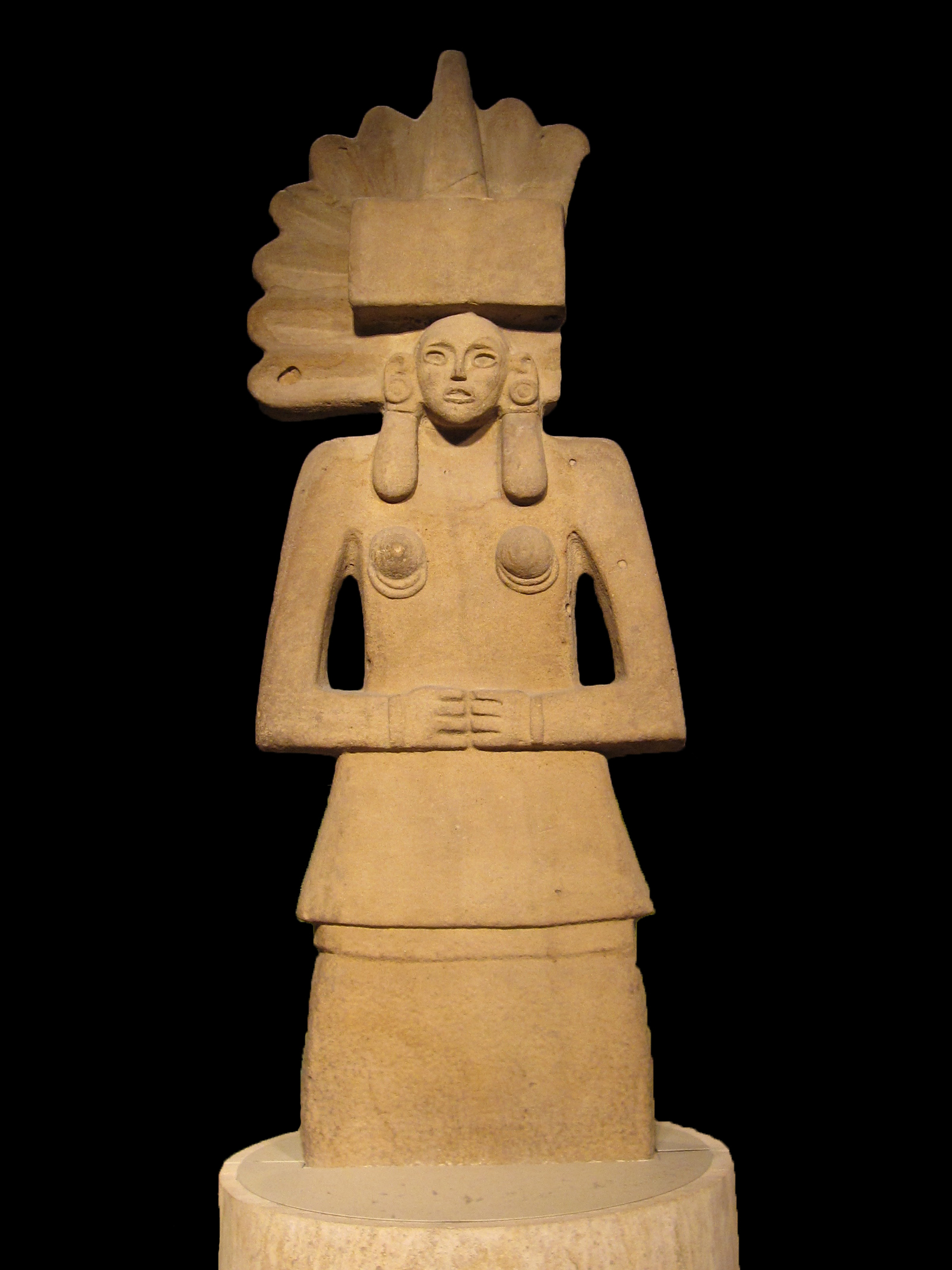
Toci

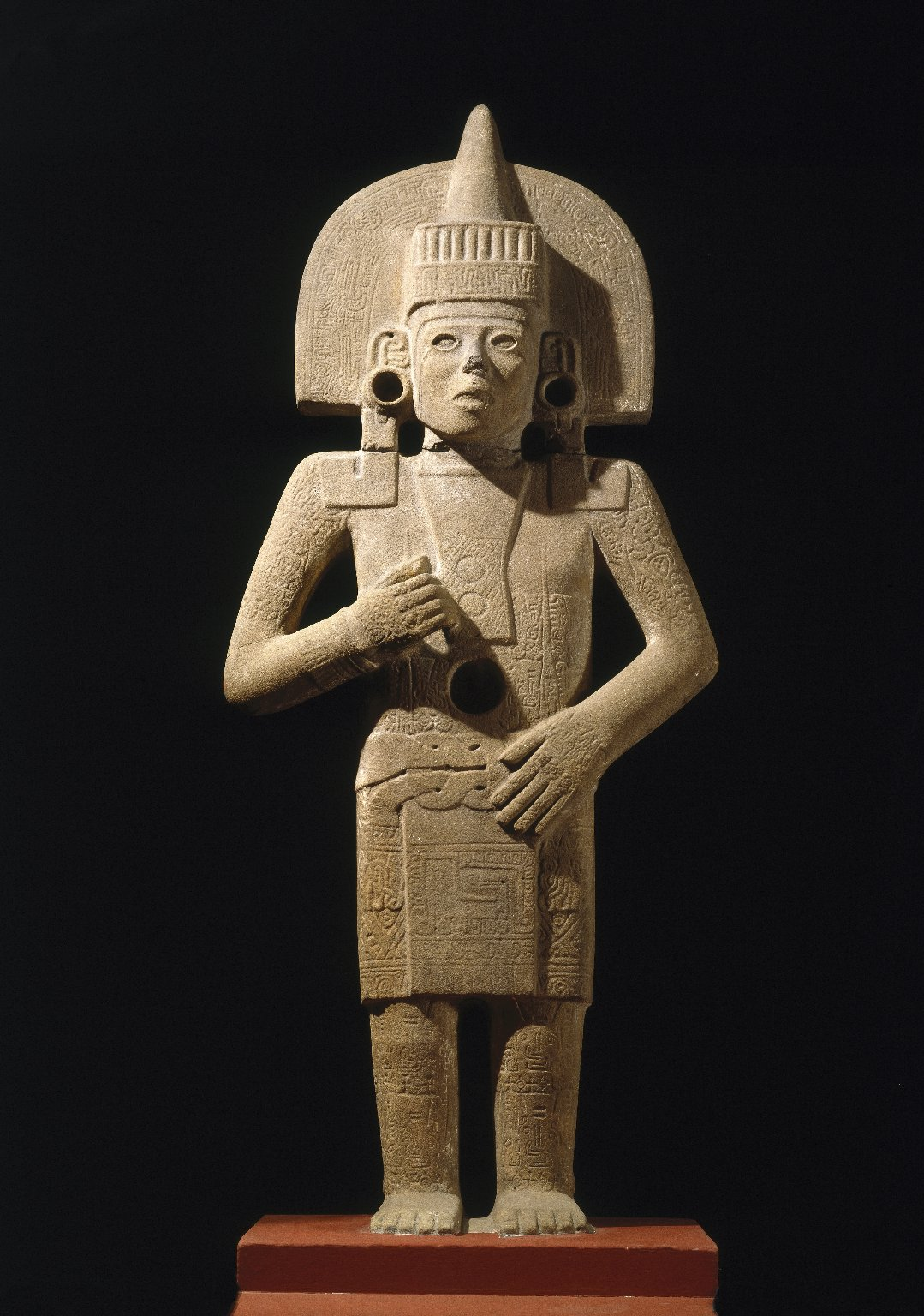
Ehecatl

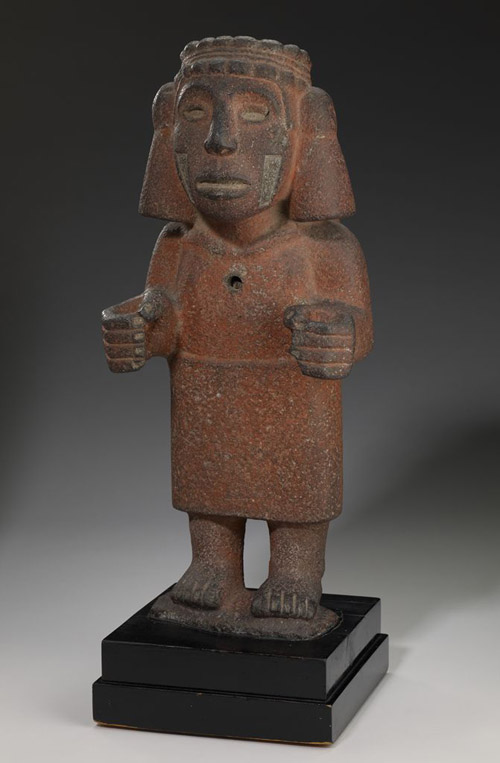
Chalchiuhtlicue

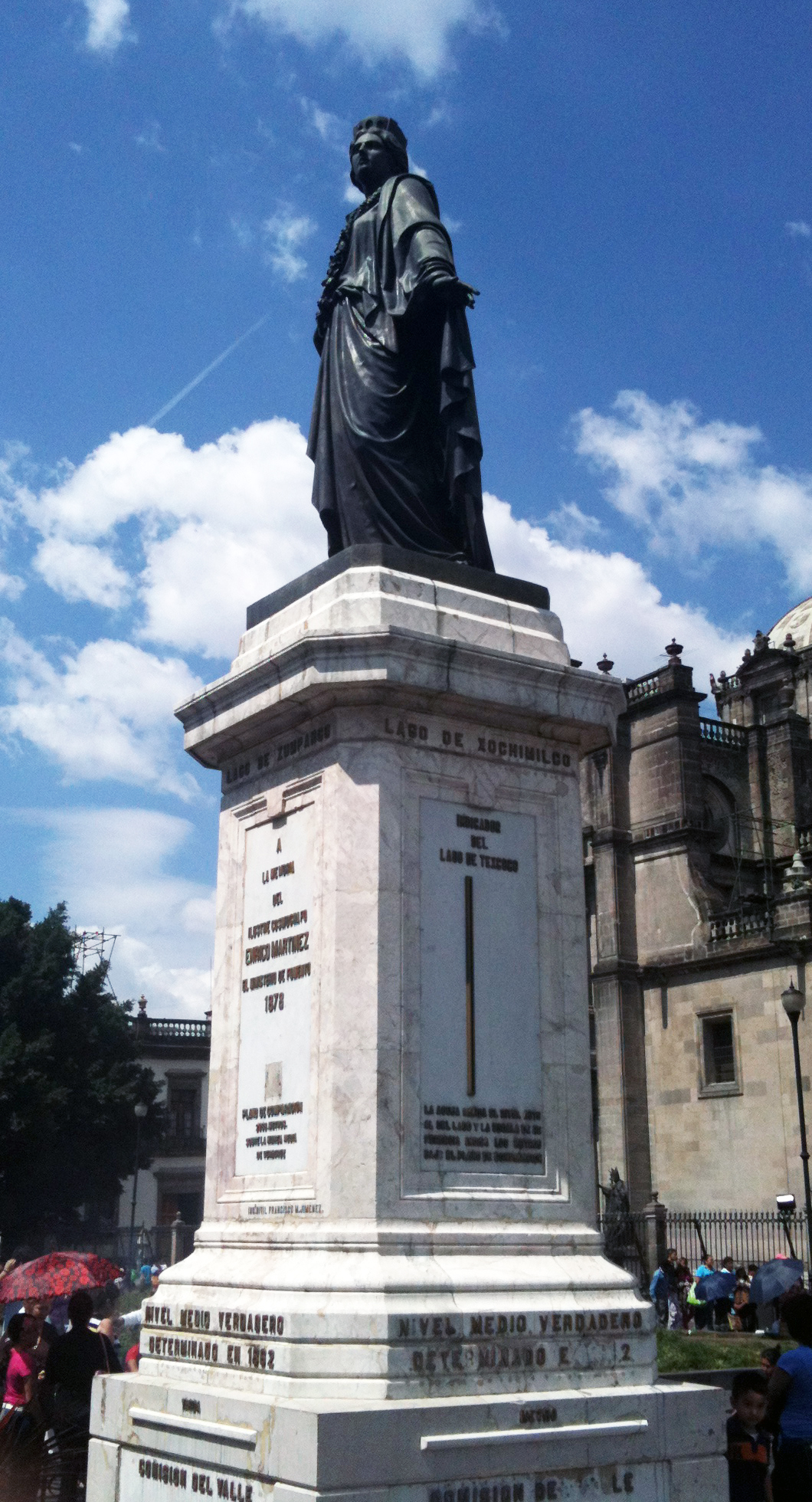
Monument to Enrico Martínez

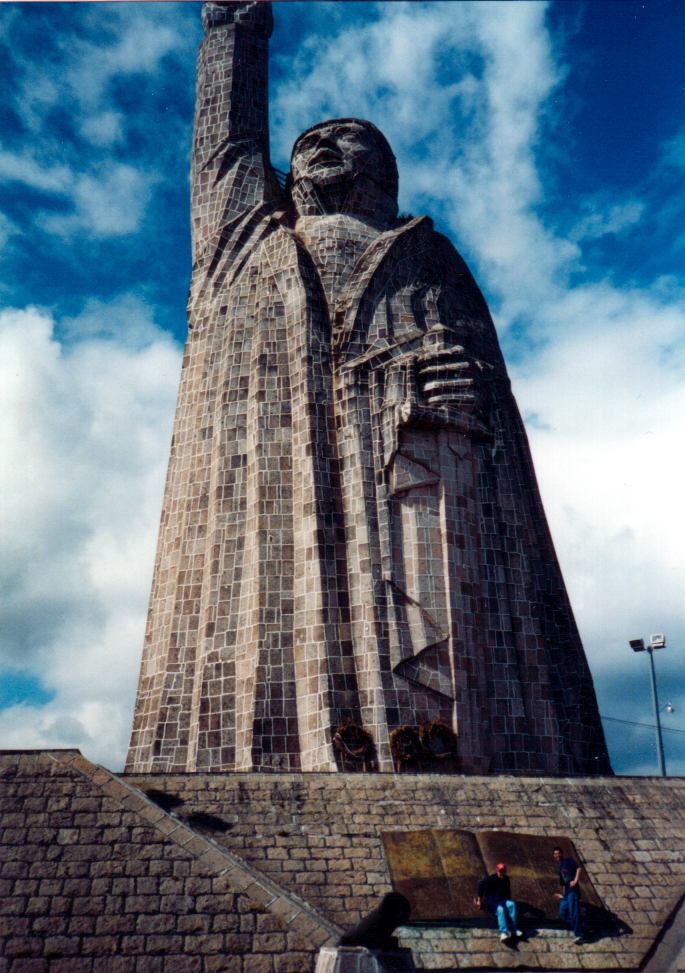
Statue of José María Morelos, Janitzio, Michoacán

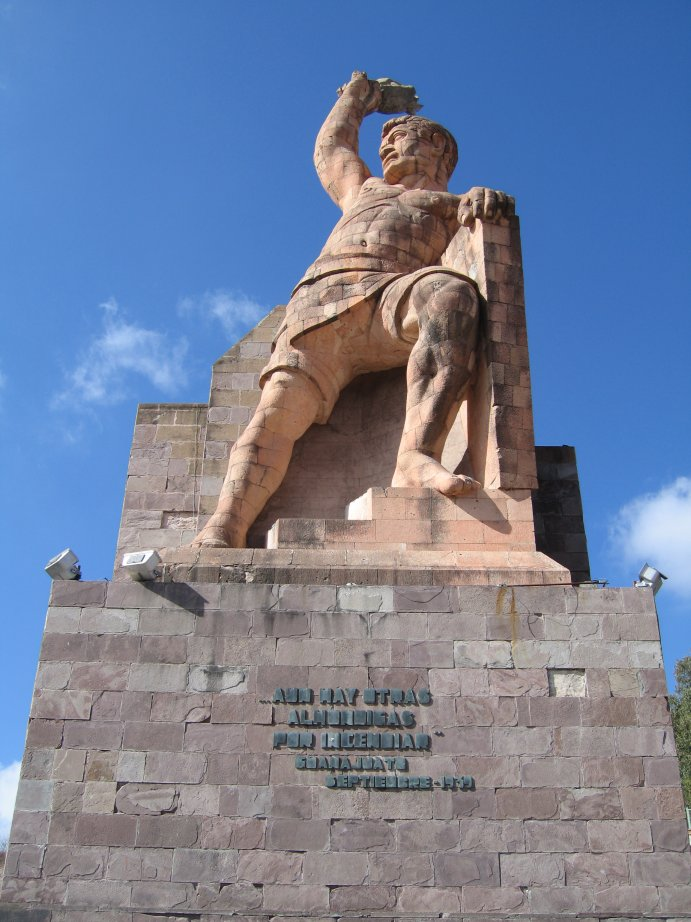
El Pípila

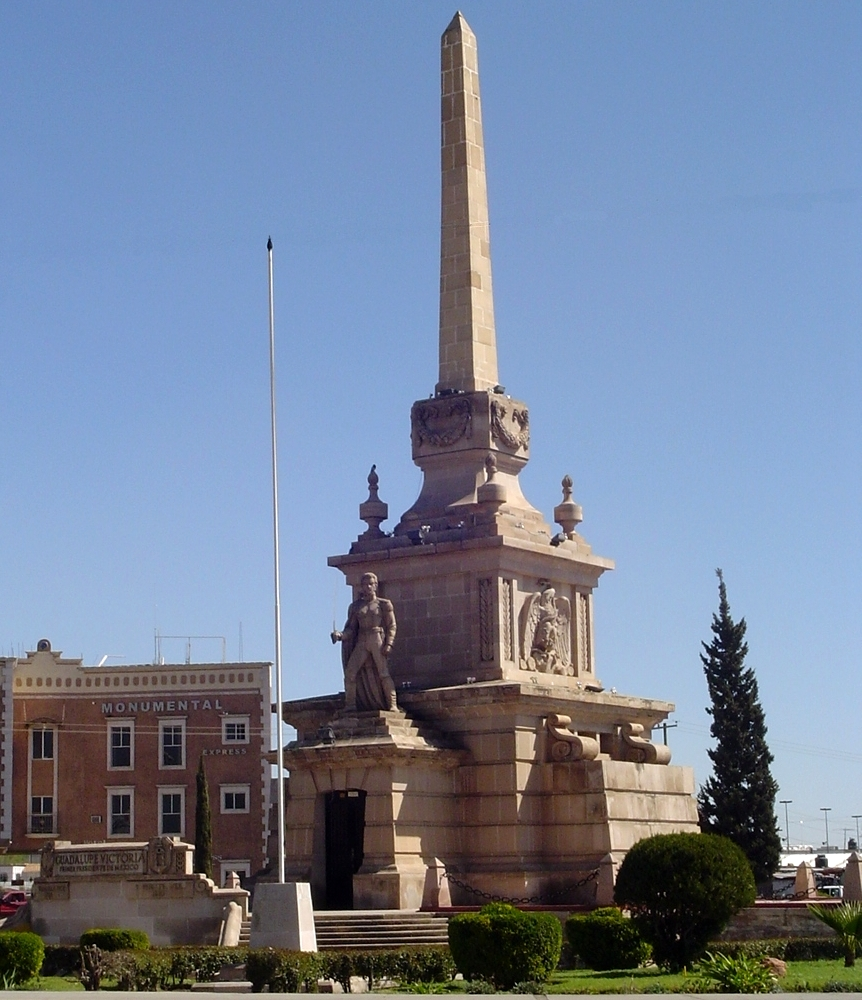
Guadalupe Victoria monument in Durango.

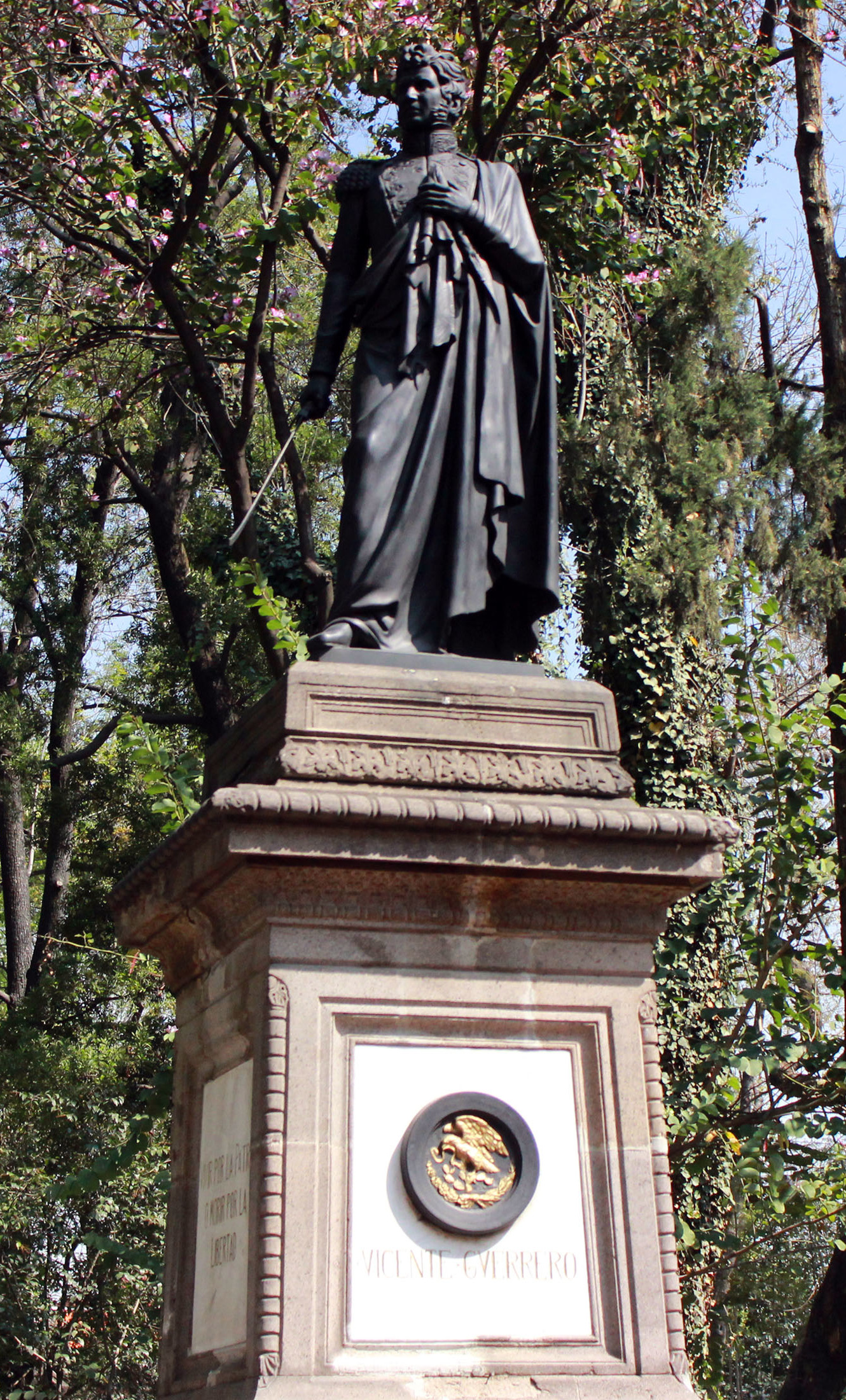
Statue of Guerrero

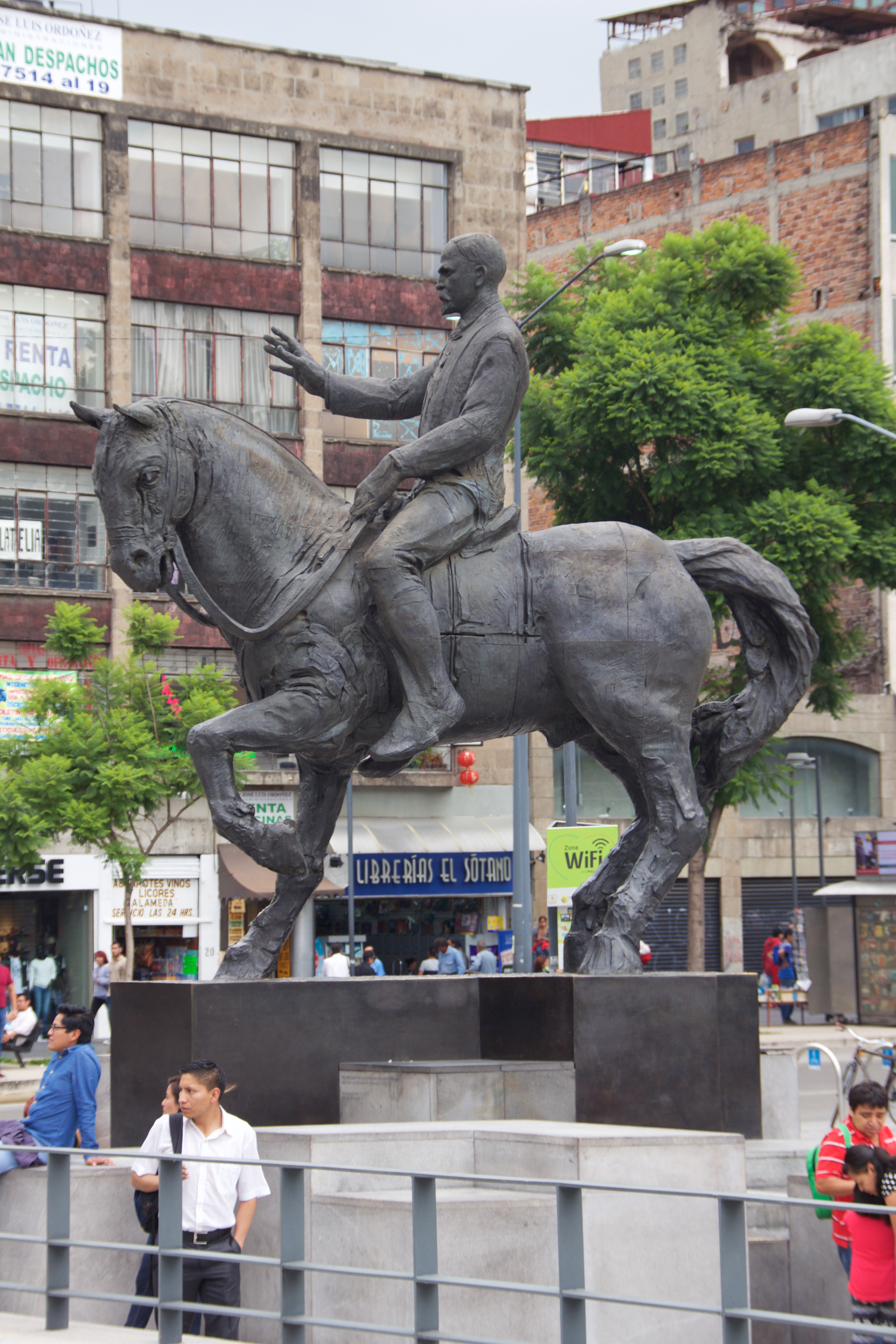
Equestrian statue of Francisco I. Madero

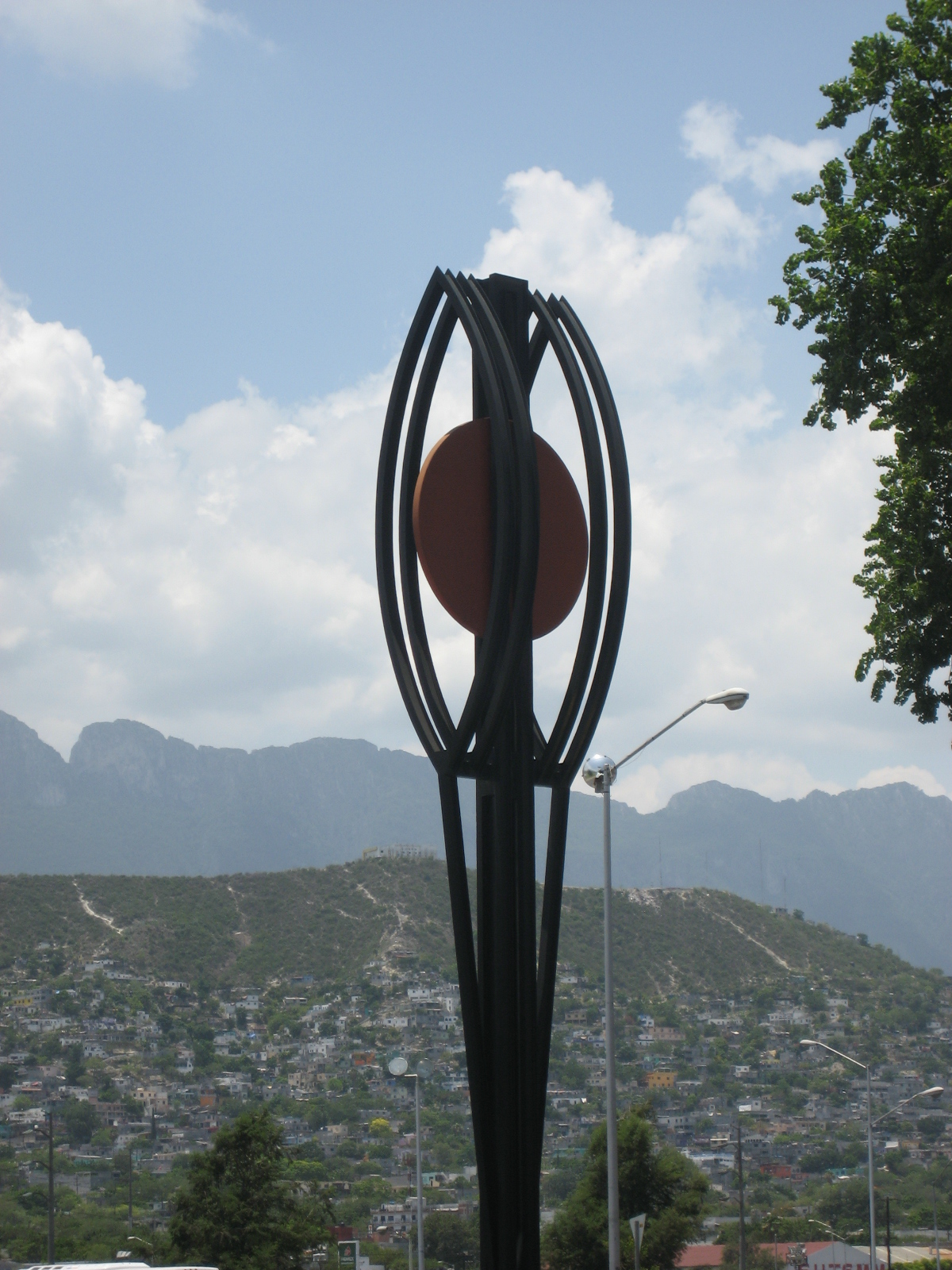
Homenaje al Sol, Rufino Tamayo

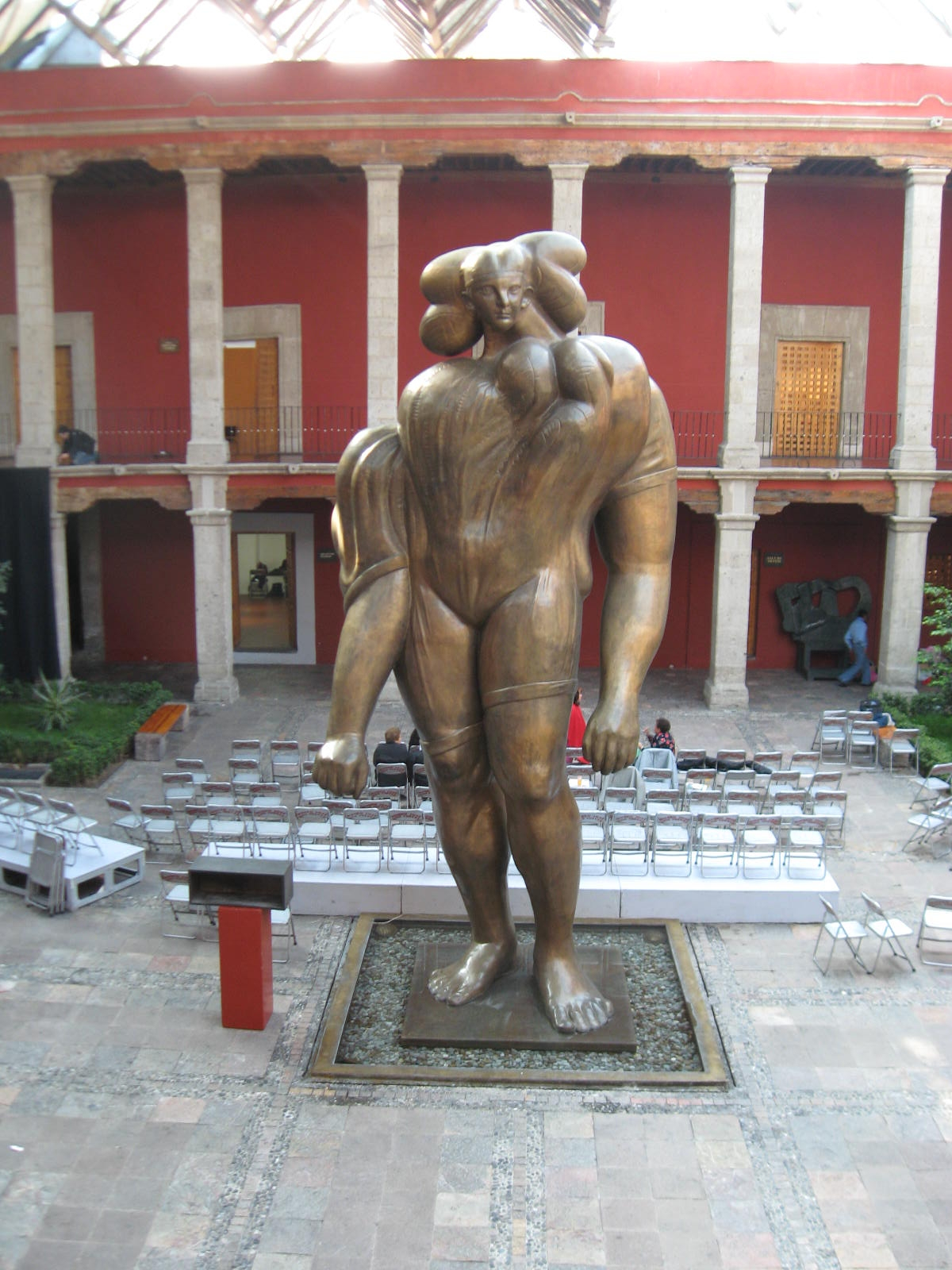
Giganta, by José Luis Cuevas.

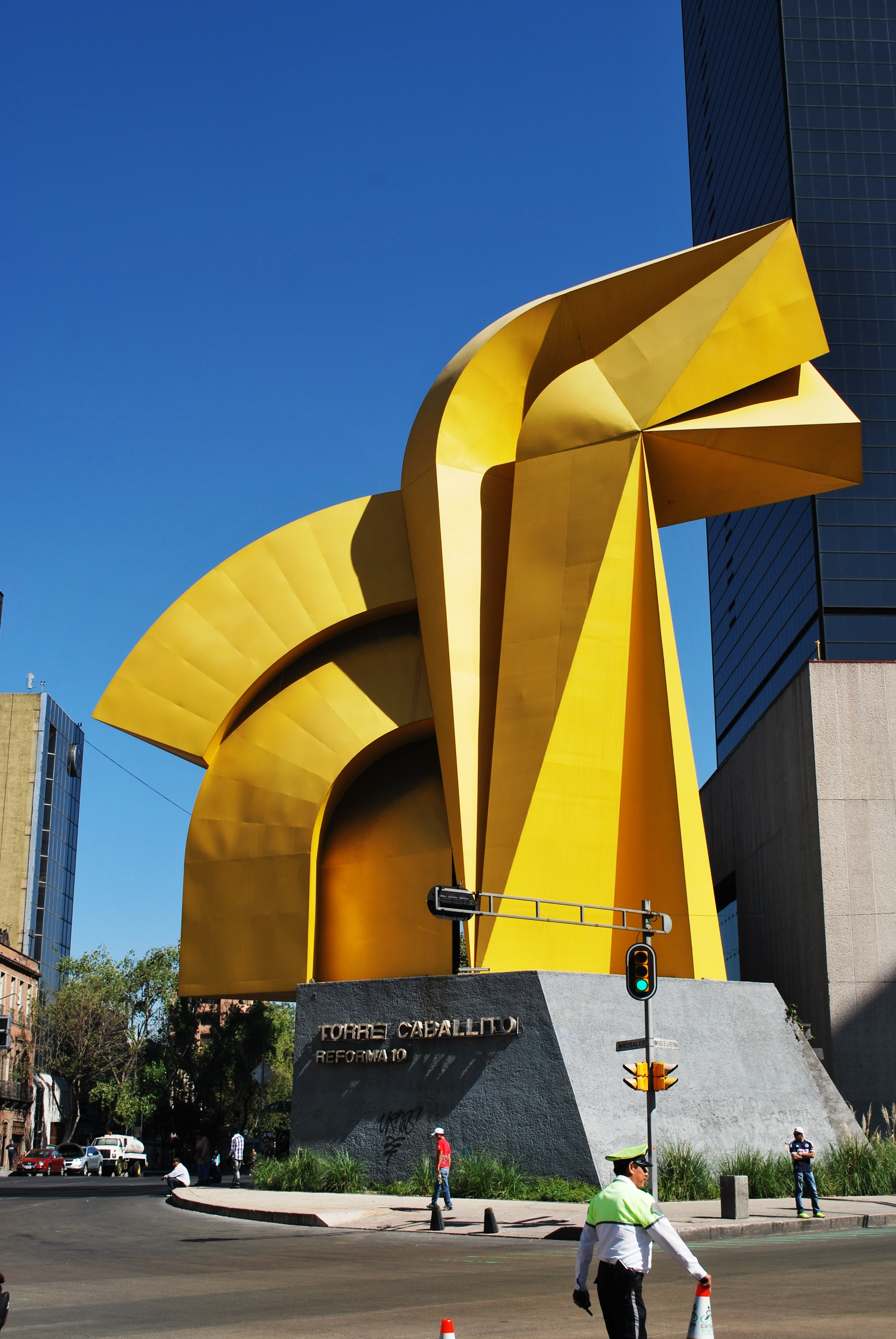
El Caballito ("horse's head")

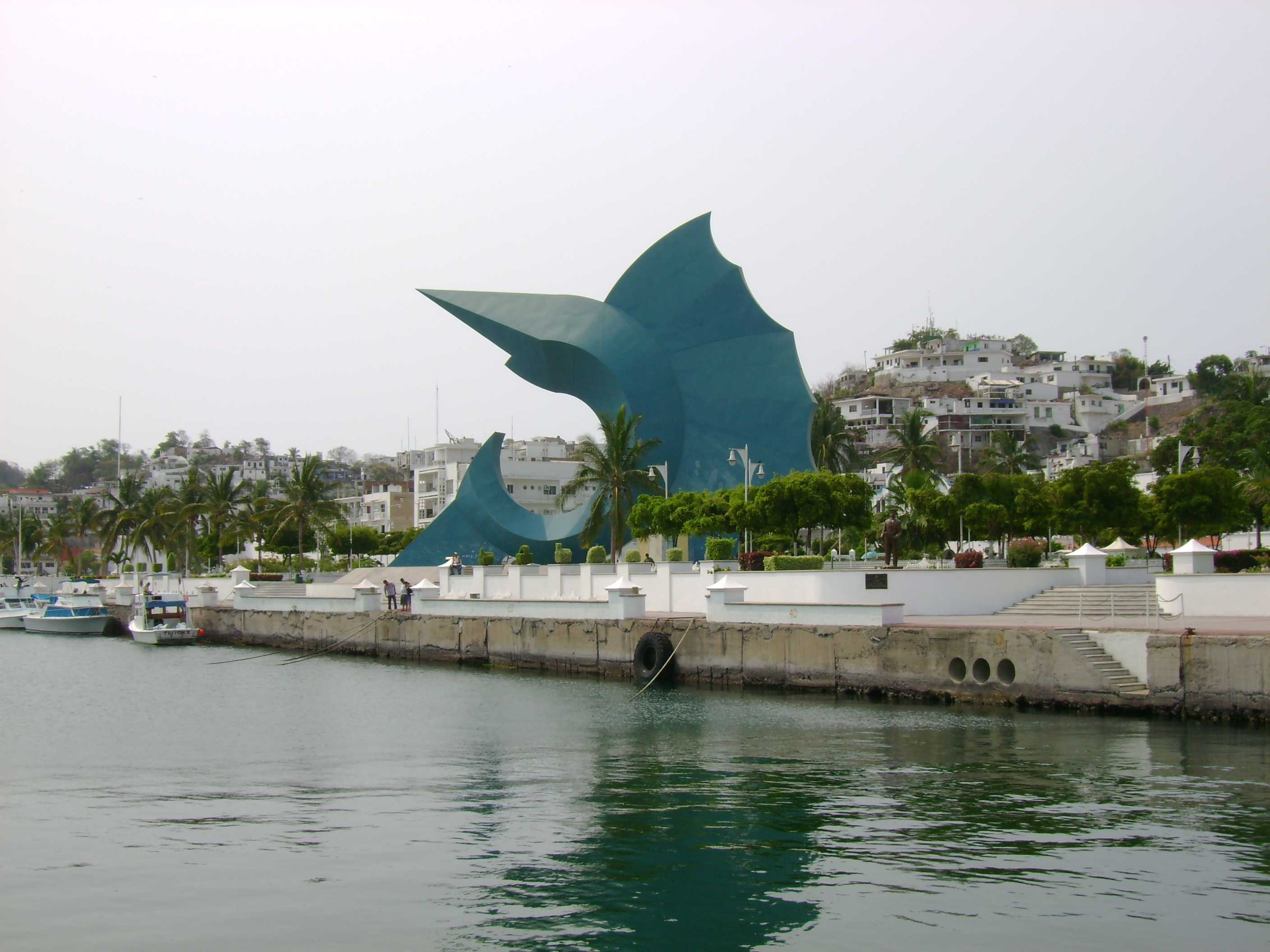
Sculpture in Manzanillo, by "Sebastián".

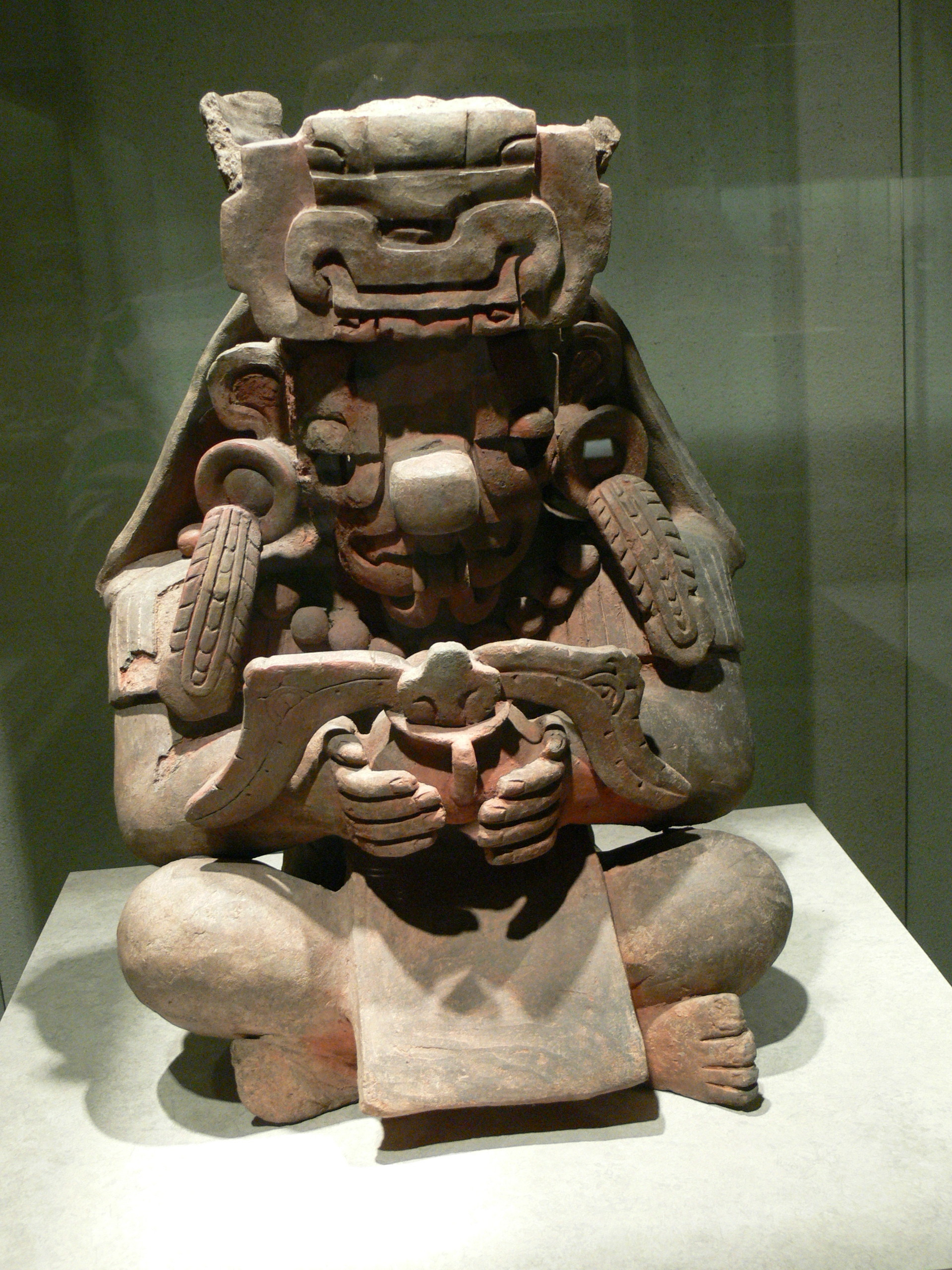
Cocijo

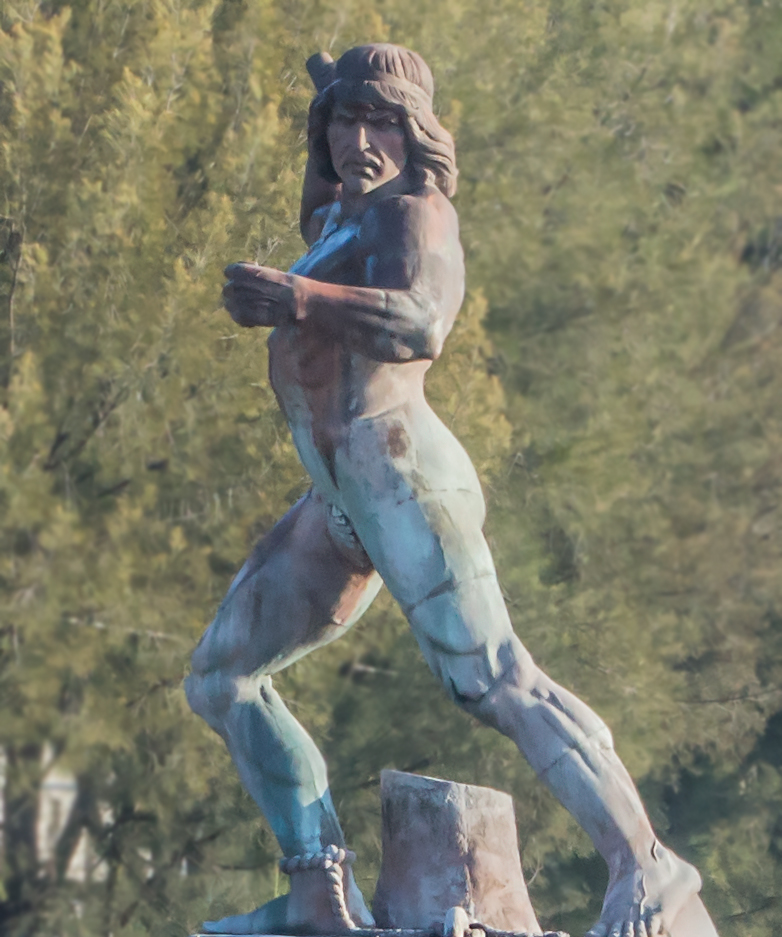
Sculpture of Tlahuicole, Tlaxcala.

== See also ==
- List of statues on Paseo de la Reforma
