= Josephine Waters Bennett =

American literary academic (1899-1975)

President of the Renaissance Society of America
- In office 1963–1964

Personal details
- Born: January 15, 1899 Lakeside, Ohio, U.S.
- Died: December 31, 1975 (aged 76) Washington, D.C., U.S.
- Spouse: Roger E. Bennett (died 1968)
- Awards: Guggenheim Fellow (1944 and 1955)

Academic background
- Education: Ohio State University; Radcliffe College
- Thesis: Renaissance neoplatonism in the poetry of Edmund Spenser (1936)
- Doctoral advisor: Milton O. Percival

Academic work
- Sub-discipline: English literature in the Middle Ages and Renaissance
- Institutions: Hunter College; Ohio State University; Tufts College; University of Tennessee

Josephine Waters Bennett (January 15, 1899 – December 31, 1975) was an American literary academic who was president of the Renaissance Society of America from 1963 to 1964. A Guggenheim Fellow, she wrote the books The Evolution of The Faerie Queene (1942), The Rediscovery of Sir John Mandeville (1954), and 'Measure for Measure' as Royal Entertainment (1966), and she worked as professor at Hunter College.

== Biography ==
She was born on January 15, 1899, in Lakeside, Ohio. Born to Josephine Kelly and Ralph Leicester Waters, Bennett also had a sister.

She studied at Ohio State University, where she got her BA in 1924 and her MA in 1925, before working as an assistant instructor in English from 1927 to 1928. After studying at Radcliffe College (1928-1931) and working as an English instructor at Tufts College (1930-1931) and the University of Tennessee (1932), she returned to Ohio State to get her PhD in English in 1936. Her doctoral dissertation Renaissance neoplatonism in the poetry of Edmund Spenser was supervised by Milton O. Percival. Working simultaneously under her previous position at Ohio State, she was promoted to instructor in 1936.

In 1942, she started working at Hunter College as an instructor in English. She also worked at City University of New York. After serving as its first executive director, she was president of the Renaissance Society of America from 1963 to 1964. She also went to University of Illinois Chicago as a visiting professor.

Bennett specialized in English literature. In 1942, she published The Evolution of The Faerie Queene, a study of the Edmund Spenser epic poem. In 1954, she published another book, a study on Mandeville's Travels titled The Rediscovery of Sir John Mandeville During the later part of her career, she became interested in Shakespearean studies, with her next book 'Measure for Measure' as Royal Entertainment (1966) being on the aforementioned play. In addition to writing books, she was editor of a 1941 edition of Thomas Blenerhasset's A Revelation of the True Minerva, Much Ado for the Pelican Shakespeare and The Pelican Shakespeare, as well as the first editor of the journal Renaissance News.

She was a 1934-1935 American Association of University Women Dorothy Bridgman Atkinson Fellow. In 1944, she was awarded a Guggenheim Fellowship to do work on "a book on the cultural development of England from the time of Chaucer to the death of Sir Thomas More". She received another Guggenheim Fellowship in 1955.

She was married to Harvard University professor Roger E. Bennett until his death in 1968.

Bennett died on December 31, 1975, in Washington, D.C., where she was doing research on the Shakespeare's sonnets at the Folger Shakespeare Library, reportedly "of a stroke in her sleep" at a hotel. She was 75. At the time of her death, she was a resident of Sandwich, Illinois.

== Biography ==
- (ed., by Thomas Blenerhasset) A Revelation of the True Minerva (1941)
- The Evolution of The Faerie Queene (1942)
- The Rediscovery of Sir John Mandeville (1954)
- 'Measure for Measure' as Royal Entertainment (1966)
