= Paul Henry Giddens =

American historian

Paul Henry Giddens (1903–1984) was an American professor, writer, and historian of the beginnings of the oil industry in Pennsylvania and the American Midwest.

He was a professor of history and political science at Allegheny College in Meadville, Pennsylvania. In 1945–1946 he was a Guggenheim Fellow partly in recognition of the value of his 1938 book The Birth of the Oil Industry.

== Papers of Paul H. Giddens ==
The American Heritage Center at the University of Wyoming has the papers of Giddens. He worked closely with Ida Tarbell in 1934–1938 in preparing his book The Birth of the Oil Industry. In addition to serving as an historical consultant to Standard Oil Company of Indiana, Giddens collected the papers and other materials of several oil pioneers, including George H. Bissell and the chemist Herbert W. C. Tweddle.

== Works ==
- The birth of the oil industry. NY: Macmillan. 1938.
- Pennsylvania petroleum, 1750-1872: a documentary history. Titusville, Pennsylvania: Pennsylvania Historical and Museum Commission. 1947.
- Early days of oil, a pictorial history of the beginnings of the industry in Pennsylvania. Princeton University Press. 1948. 149 pp. (Many of the photographs reproduced in this book were taken by John A. Mather.)
- Standard Oil Company (Indiana): oil pioneer of the Middle West. NY: Appleton-Century-Crofts. 1955.
