= Carole Bache =

American writer

Caroline Bache McMahon, known by her pen name Carol Bache (February 17, 1889 – 1950), was an American writer. Bache worked for United States Military Intelligence Division in Japan for 14 years, and wrote a book about her experience of Japanese culture, Paradox Isle (Alfred A. Knopf, New York, 1943). She also published stories in the Atlantic Monthly.

In 1945, she was awarded a Guggenheim Fellowship for fiction.
