= Hebru Brantley's Nevermore Park =

Immersive art project in Chicago

Nevermore Park was an immersive art installation in the Pilsen neighborhood on the Lower West Side of Chicago, open from October 24, 2019, to December 29, 2019. The exhibit was created by Hebru Brantley as a realization of his fictional neighborhood of Nevermore Park, the home of Brantley's recurring characters, Flyboy and Lil Mama. Brantley also focused on honoring Chicago history and emphasizing themes of community and black heroism.

== Background ==
In 2018, Brantley had the idea to turn his old studio in Pilsen into an immersive walk-through experience that highlighted the recurring characters and themes of his murals and art installations. He wanted the project to be familiar, resembling a classic Chicago neighborhood such as Hyde Park or Morgan Park, but with an element of fantasy, one drawn from his comic book influences. He created Nevermore Park to be accessible to people of all ages and backgrounds, especially overlooked local black families in Chicago. Brantley, commenting on the project in 2019, stated:

"Nevermore Park is meant to be a fun, accessible, and invigorating experience for audiences of all ages to participate in a narrative-driven fine art installation... This project is about reclaiming history—both in the United States and the city of Chicago—through a lens that speaks to empowerment and giving agency to a historically disenfranchised community."[3]

Brantley centered Nevermore Park around the world of Brantley's characters, allowing visitors to experience a day in the life of his characters Flyboy and Lil Mama. On October 24, 2019, the exhibition opened to the public.

== Characters ==
The central characters of Nevermore Park, Flyboy and Lil Mama, are a young black boy and girl, respectively, with helmets and goggles resembling those of the Tuskegee Airmen, the group of African American military pilots who helped desegregate the armed forces during World War II. Through these characters, Brantley focused on the idea of black heroism, using the style of comic strips, as evident in Flyboy and Lil Mama's large, circular, black eyes and rounded, simple features.

In the music video for his 2016 song "Angels," Chicago native Chance the Rapper partnered with Brantley to portray Brantley's characters. The video begins with Chance flying through the city while wearing a jumpsuit and goggles resembling the Flyboy character design, and one of Brantley's murals is later featured in the background.

== Exhibition ==
On initial entry, Nevermore Park appeared to be a normal art gallery, with Brantley's works situated on stark white walls. After a short walkthrough, however, the walls crumbled, and visitors were transported to the fictional neighborhood of Nevermore Park. Brantley wanted the exhibition to be highly interactive, with visitors more connected to the art than if it were displayed in a traditional art gallery. Brantley explained to CBS Chicago:

"This whole thing is meant to engage. Run through, touch, climb; the purpose of this is to put you in a world that has some familiarity to our own, but picks and pulls from different eras throughout history, particularly Chicago history... It's up to you to in terms of your level of engagement and how you want to navigate through the space."[6]

=== Features ===
Pieces of Chicago past and present were present throughout the full exhibition. Viewers walked through a newsstand filled with Jet and Ebony magazines, black lifestyle publications based out of Chicago. Posters along the walls featured black musical legends from Chicago, such as Louis Armstrong and Mahalia Jackson. In the section of Nevermore Park resembling a modern day Chicago elevated train car, a vintage Pullman car sat at the very end as a nod to both the city's past and the 1894 Pullman Railway strikes. One corner of the exhibit – a workshop full of cogs and tools that used the iconography of Flyboy and Lil Mama – featured the flag and jackets of the Tuskegee Airmen.

Everything inside the exhibit was meant to be walked on, taken, or touched, including a large play area which, from its exterior, resembled the head of Lil Mama. Additionally, the "town newsstand" featured fictional Nevermore Herald newspapers, with a cover story on Flyboy, that visitors could bring with them.

== Reception ==
Nevermore Park received positive reviews from the community. Initially scheduled to close December 1, 2019, the opening was extended to December 29 due to demand. Said Brantley to CBS Chicago about the extension:

"The City of Chicago has embraced Nevermore Park wholeheartedly. In return, and in time for the holidays, I want to make sure the youth who otherwise wouldn't have the opportunity to experience Nevermore Park, get to tour the home of Flyboy and Lil Mama."

Sticking with the emphasis on community building, Brantley also allowed Chicago Public School groups to visit Nevermore Park for free on Wednesdays in December.
