= American Park =

"American Park" may refer to

- American Park (Mexico City)
- League Park (Cincinnati), formerly called American Park
