= Paul Harris (Rotary) =

American lawyer (1868–1947)

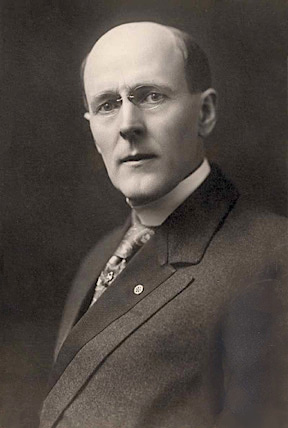
- Paul Harris
- Born: Paul Percy Harris; April 19, 1868; Racine, Wisconsin
- Died: January 27, 1947 (aged 78); Beverly, Chicago
- Education: University of Vermont; Princeton University; University of Iowa
- Occupation: Lawyer
- Spouse: Jean Thomson Harris
- Parent(s): George and Cornilia Harris

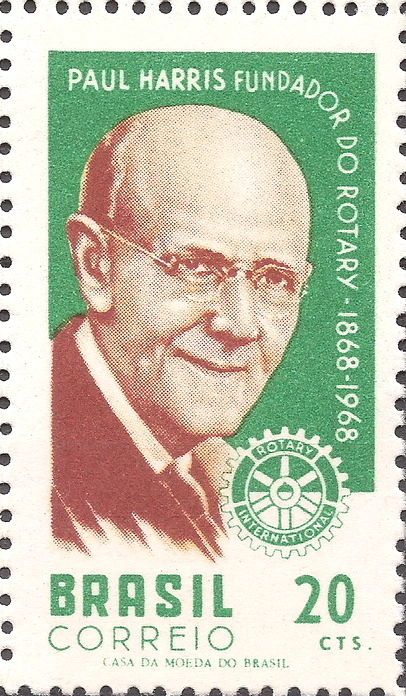
Paul Percy Harris on a 1968 stamp of Brazil

Paul Percy Harris (April 19, 1868 – January 27, 1947) was a Chicago, Illinois-based attorney. He founded the club that became the humanitarian organisation Rotary International in 1905.

== Personal life ==
Harris was born in Racine, Wisconsin, to George and Cornilia Harris. He was the couple's second child. At age three, when his family fell on hard times, Paul was moved with a sibling to Vermont to live with his paternal grandparents, Howard and Pamela Harris. Harris would later write about his parents: "Of all charges which might have been made against George and Cornelia, parsimony would have stood the least chance. They were both royal spenders."

While living in Vermont, he attended Black River Academy in Ludlow, but was expelled after only a short time. At his secondary school in Rutland, he was known as a prankster. After secondary school, he attended the University of Vermont. In 1886, he was expelled in an incident involving a secret society. In the fall of 1887, he attended Princeton University.

Due to the death of his grandfather in the spring of 1888, he did not return to school the following fall. Harris soon moved to Des Moines, Iowa, where he was apprenticed at a local law firm. After completing his apprenticeship, he studied law at the University of Iowa. He graduated with a Bachelor of Laws in June 1891. However, for the next five years, he worked odd jobs: for a newspaper as a salesman and a reporter, on fruit farms, as an actor and cowboy, and on cattle ships that traveled to Europe. In 1896, Harris moved to Chicago, eventually settling in the Morgan Park neighborhood, where he lived the rest of his life (except for spending summers in Michigan and winters in Alabama during his later years).

It was 2 July 1910 in Chicago that Harris married Jean Thomson, a Scotswoman whom he had met at a local nature club. Jean traveled the world with Harris in support of Rotary. She helped to make women an important part of Rotary, eventually leading to all Rotary Clubs admitting women as full members. The couple never had any children.

Harris sought meaningful personal and spiritual relationships in addition to his professional achievements. He attended religious services on Sundays but visited many different churches rather than aligning himself with one congregation. Later in his life, he said that his religious affiliations were, like himself, difficult to label:

I really have no church affiliations … I am not easily classified; that is to say my convictions are not that of that definite nature essential to whole-hearted affiliation with the general run of churches. … Of course, these days one can hear the best of preaching over the radio and I generally hear three or four sermons every Sunday.

== Career ==
Harris began his law practice in 1896 in Chicago's main business district and continued being active in this practice for the next forty years. After establishing his law practice, Harris began to consider the benefits of the formation of a social organization for local professionals. In 1905, Harris organized the first Rotary Club "in fellowship and friendship" with three clients and local businessmen, Silvester Schele, Gustavus Loehr, and Hiram Shorey. His initial goal was solely to create a club of professional and business men for friendship and fellowship. Soon, Harris realized that Rotary needed a greater purpose.

When Harris was elected as third president of the Chicago Rotary Club in 1907, the club initiated its first public service project, the construction of public toilets in Chicago. This step transformed Rotary into a Service Club. This action was facilitated by the formation of the Executive Committee (now Ways and Means Committee). This Committee was open to all members and their noon meetings began tradition of club luncheon meetings. Harris had great ambitions for Rotary's growth, and very early in the organization's history new clubs were started, first on the west coast, and then all over the US and in Europe. By 1910, at least 15 new clubs had begun in major cities. That August, the existing 16 Rotary Clubs held a national convention in Chicago. There they unanimously chose to unify as the National Association of Rotary Clubs. Eventually, the organization became the International Association of Rotary Clubs, helping to realize Harris's dream worldwide. Through his work with the Rotary Club, Harris received awards from numerous national governments.

== Death and legacy ==
In his later life, Harris reduced his involvement in both the Rotary Club and his legal practice, but continued to write. He often spent his winters in Alabama with his wife. In early 1946, while vacationing with his wife in Alabama, Harris grew ill. He returned to Beverly, Illinois, but never recovered fully. He died on 27 January 1947 at the age of 78. He was interred at Mount Hope Cemetery in Chicago's Morgan Park neighborhood. His autobiography, My Road to Rotary, was published the following year.

=== Rotary International ===
By the time of Harris's death, Rotary International had grown to more than 200,000 members in 75 countries. While the club provides a venue for both business and social networking, the primary focus is on local and international service projects. As of 2022, there are about 1.4 million members worldwide.

In cooperation with Rotary International, several towns have established a Rotary Heritage trail. It includes Harris's birthplace in Racine, Wisconsin, and a downtown plaza named after him, as well as the organization's current headquarters in Evanston, Illinois, his home, and his final resting place.

=== Paul Harris Fellow ===
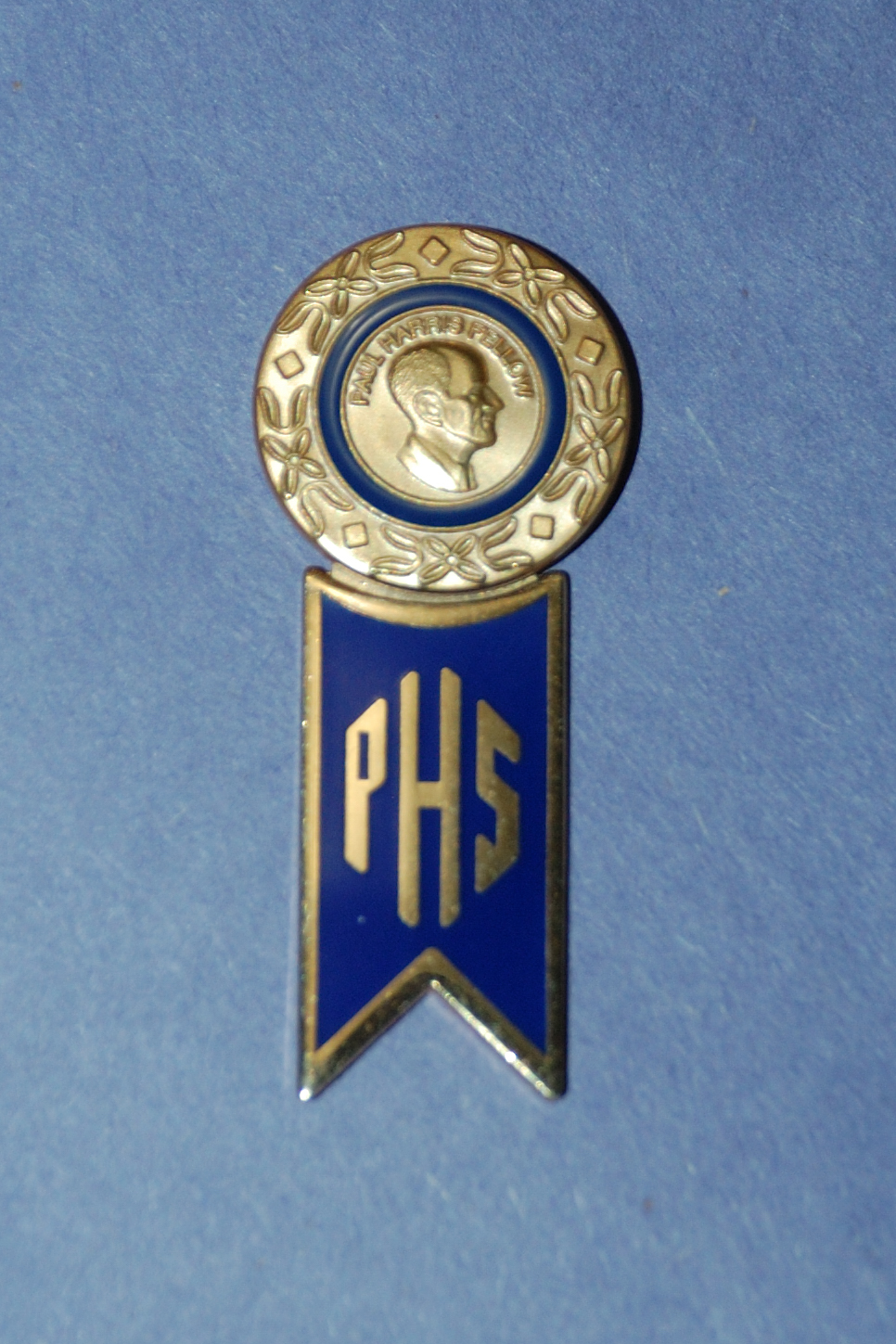
Paul Harris Fellow Pin and Paul Harris Society Hanger

Individuals who have contributed $1,000 or more to the Annual Program Fund, the Polio Plus Fund or the Humanitarian Grants Program of the Rotary Foundation are recognized as Paul Harris Fellows. Additionally, individual Rotary clubs may from time to time award the honor to an individual who meets the high professional and personal standards exemplified by Paul Harris, the founder of Rotary International, without the honored individual having made any monetary contribution. The recognition is not limited to Rotarians.

A Paul Harris Fellow receives a special certificate and a gold pin. At the discretion of the Fellow's club, they may also receive a gold medallion on a blue-and-gold ribbon.

Multiple-time Fellows are recognized as they continue to contribute. Additionally, Fellows receive recognition points which they may contribute towards the recognition of other members as Paul Harris Fellows.

=== Paul Harris Society ===
The Paul Harris Society is a special program administered by Rotary Districts. Paul Harris Society members make a commitment to contribute $1,000 each year to the Annual Program Fund. A Paul Harris Society member receives a "hanger" for their Paul Harris Fellow Pin with the initials PHS.

=== Monuments and memorials ===
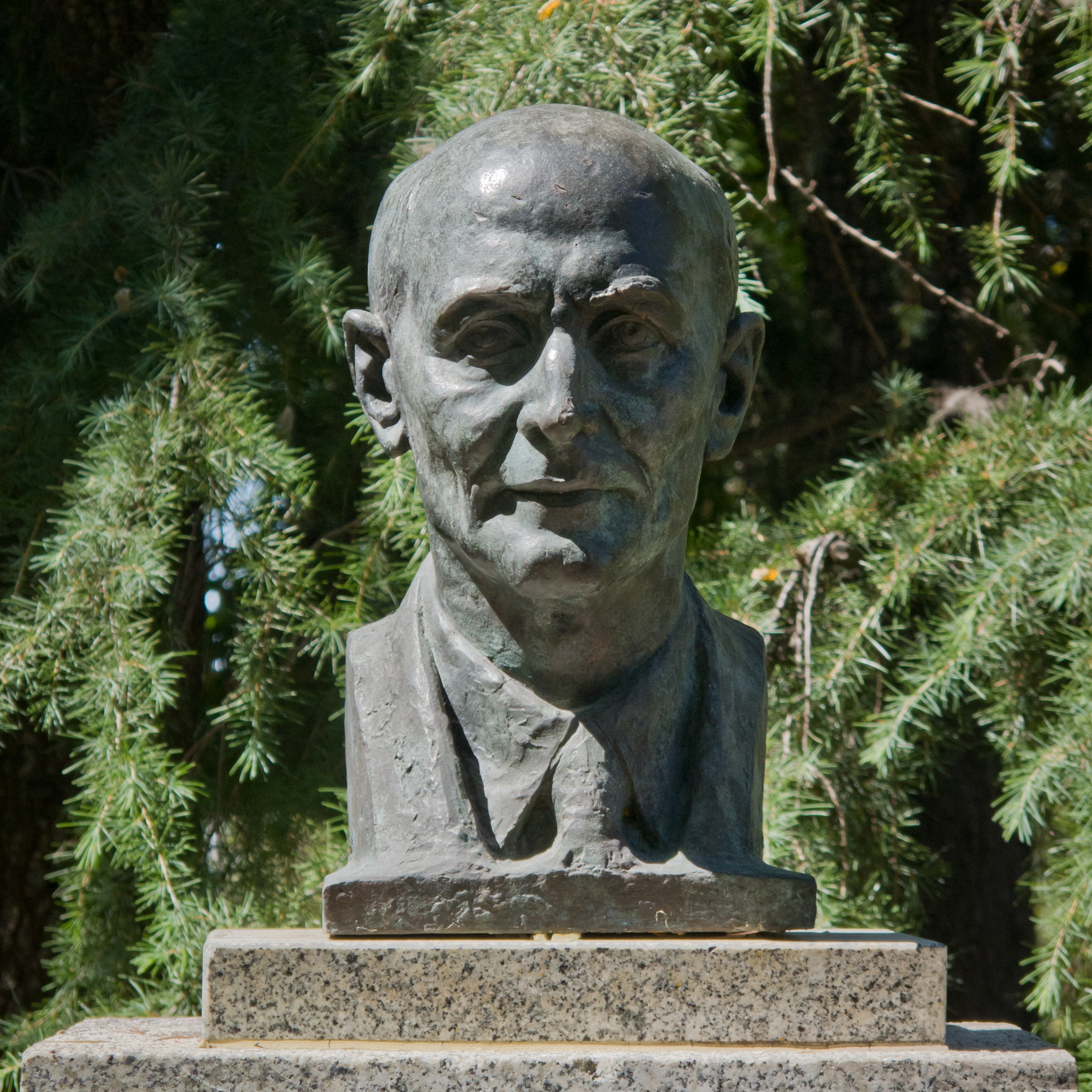
Paul Harris statue in Madrid, in 2012

There is a statue of Harris installed in American Park, Mexico City. There is also a Paul Harris Peace Forest in the Galilee in Israel.

Non-profit organization positions
Preceded by (none)	President of Rotary International; 1910–1911, 1911–1912	Succeeded by Glenn C. Mead
