= Newington Cemetery =

Cemetery in City of Edinburgh, Scotland

Coordinates: 55°55′53″N 3°09′54″W

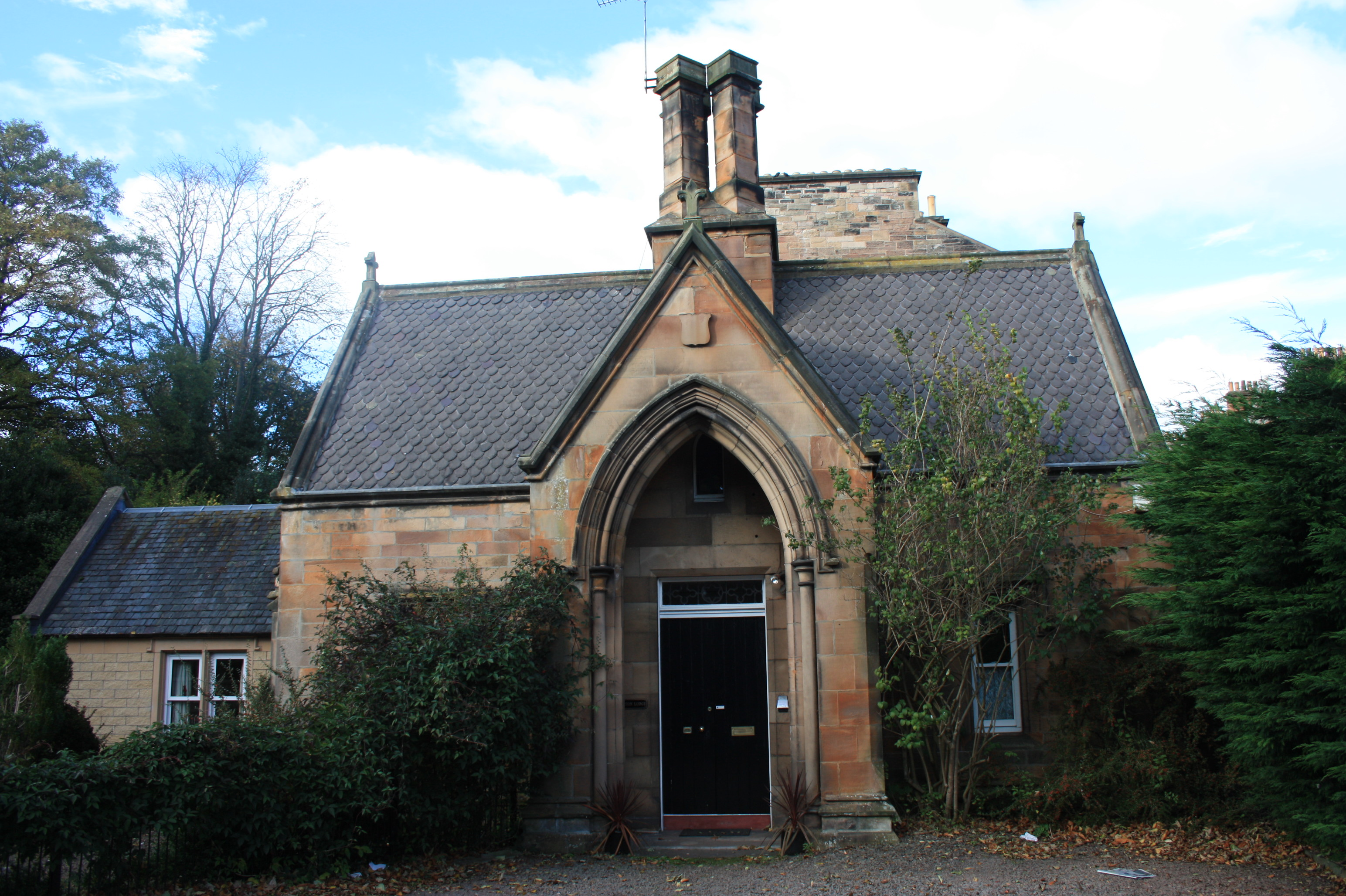
The entrance lodge, Newington Cemetery, Edinburgh

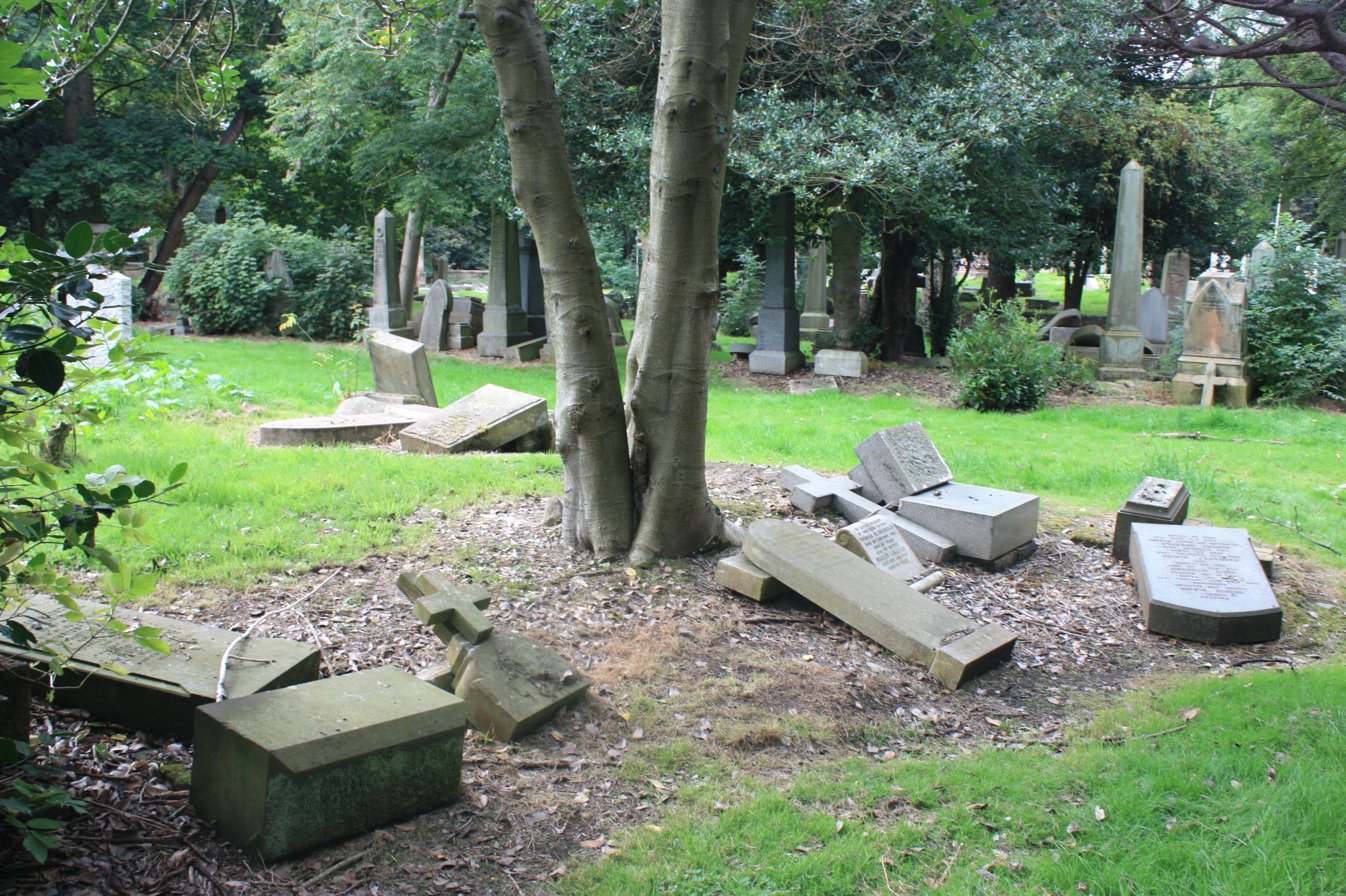
Newington Cemetery, Edinburgh, typical condition

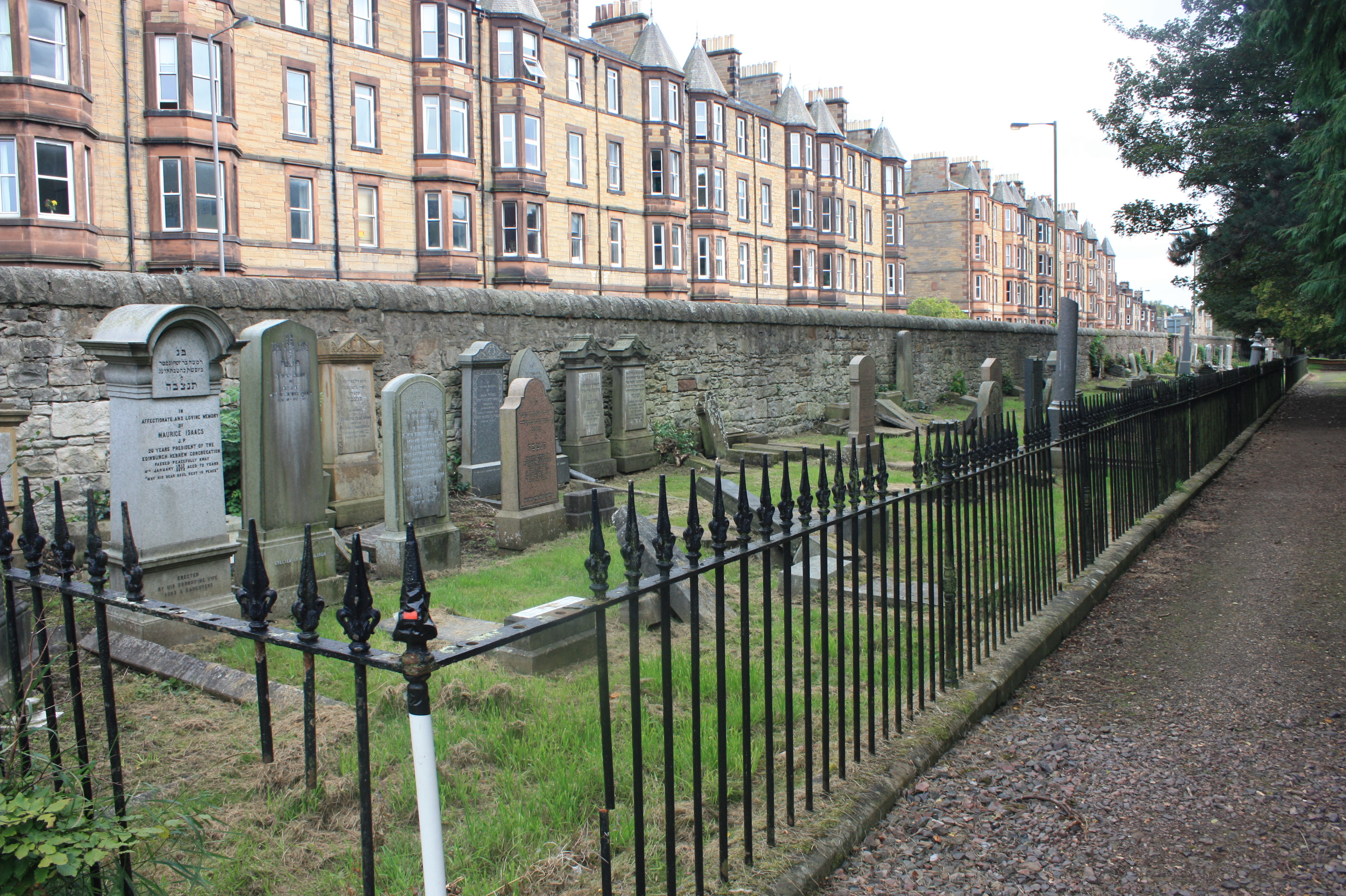
The Jewish section, Newington Cemetery

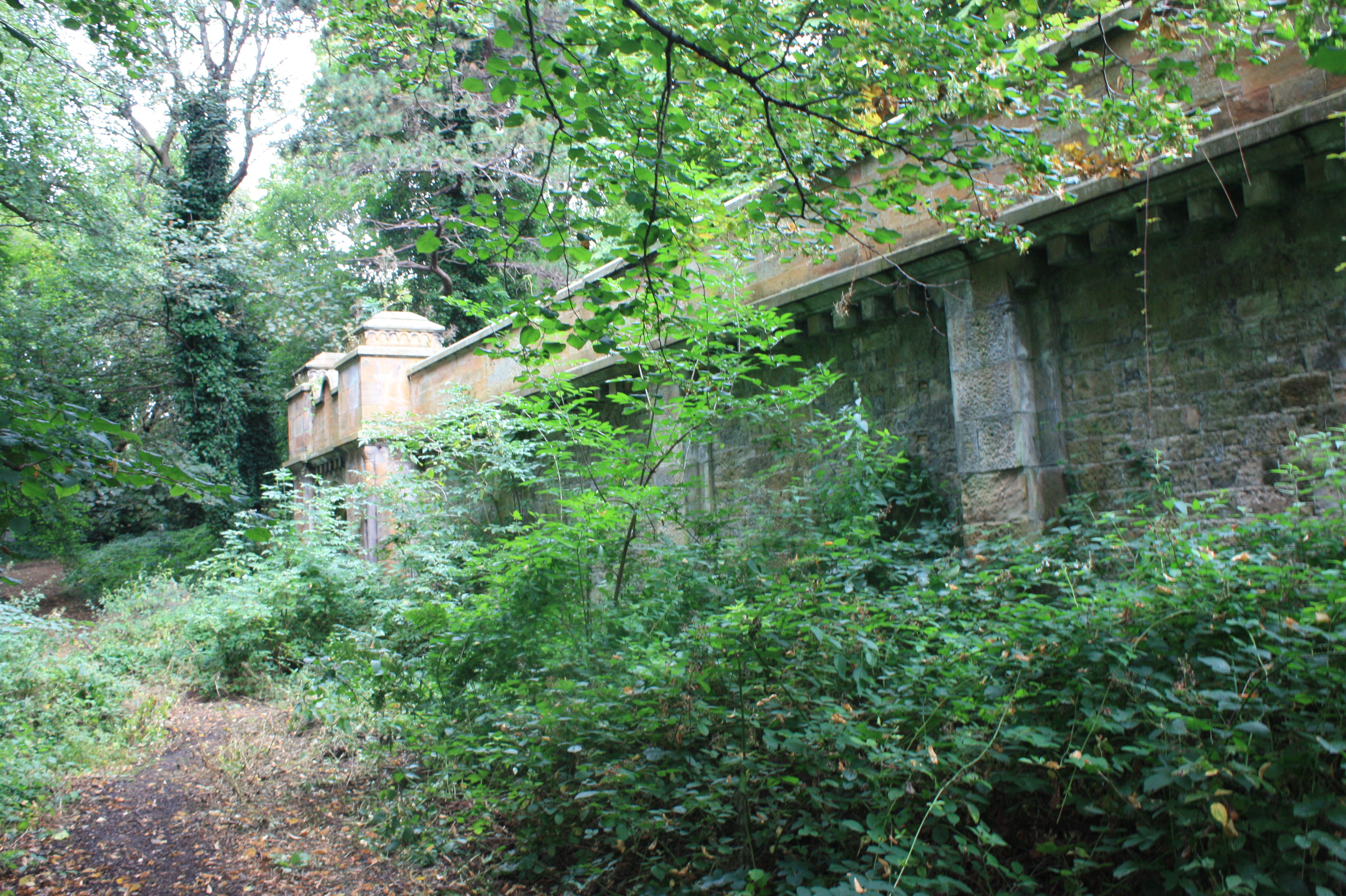
The vaults, Newington Cemetery

Newington Cemetery is a cemetery in Edinburgh, Scotland. Technically it lies beyond Newington itself, standing on an awkward elongated kite-shaped site between a railway line and Dalkeith Road, between Prestonfield and Peffermill.

== History ==
Designed in 1848 by David Cousin and originally named the Edinburgh Metropolitan Cemetery, but also sometimes called Echobank Cemetery, but is far less successful in layout than his earlier work at Dean Cemetery and Warriston Cemetery.

The original lodge house was smaller than the one seen today and was also designed by Cousin, however it was extended in 1883, by Kinnear & Peddie .

It contains a section of vaults to the north-west, laid out on a north–south axis. It was intended to be larger but was curtailed by the building of the railway line.

Many areas of Newington have been reclaimed by nature and have become an important haven for some of the city's wild life, however the sections closest to the entrance are best kept and the Friends of Newington help keep the cemetery in good order. Due to potential dangers of falling, many of the stones are no longer standing.

Of particular note are the enclosed area for Jewish burials (against the east boundary wall) and the high number of war graves (mainly in the southern half). The cemetery contains 156 Commonwealth service war graves, 142 from World War I and 14 from World War II, mainly dead from wartime military hospitals. Those whose graves are not marked by headstones are listed by name on the Screen Wall Memorial in the main War Plot (Section A1).

The raised section to the south-west, with no stones at all, contains paupers graves.

Its northern sections, having been abandoned for over thirty years, are now an important wildlife habitat within the city.

== Graves of note ==
- James Anderson (died 1913) sculpted by John Stevenson Rhind
- John Cairns (1818-1892)
- William Campbell (died 1902) organist, sculpted by William Grant Stevenson
- Sir James Caw (1864-1950) art historian
- Sir Charles Gibson Connell FRSE (1899–1986) ornithologist
- David Craigie FRSE (1793–1866), medical author
- Arthur Lloyd (1839–1904), music hall entertainer (grave lost)
- General Sir Gordon MacMillan (1897−1986), British Army general who fought in World War I and World War II
- William McTaggart (1835–1910) artist
- Arnaud Massy (1877–1950) French golfer (grave lost)
- Sir John Melville (1803–1860) Lord Provost of Edinburgh 1854 to 1859
- Rev John Ross (missionary) (1842–1915)
- Edward Sang (1805–1890) mathematician
- Gilbert Kerr (1870–1919) Ships Piper with the Scottish National Antarctic Expedition 1902–1904
- Jean Thomson Harris (1881-1963) wife of founder of Rotary
- G.S. McLennan (1883–1927) Highland piper and composer
- Rev J. V. S. Taylor (1820-1881) Indian missionary
- John Traill (1835–1897), Scottish coffee house owner
