= Pedro Domingo Murillo =

Leader in the Bolivian War of Independence (1757-1810)

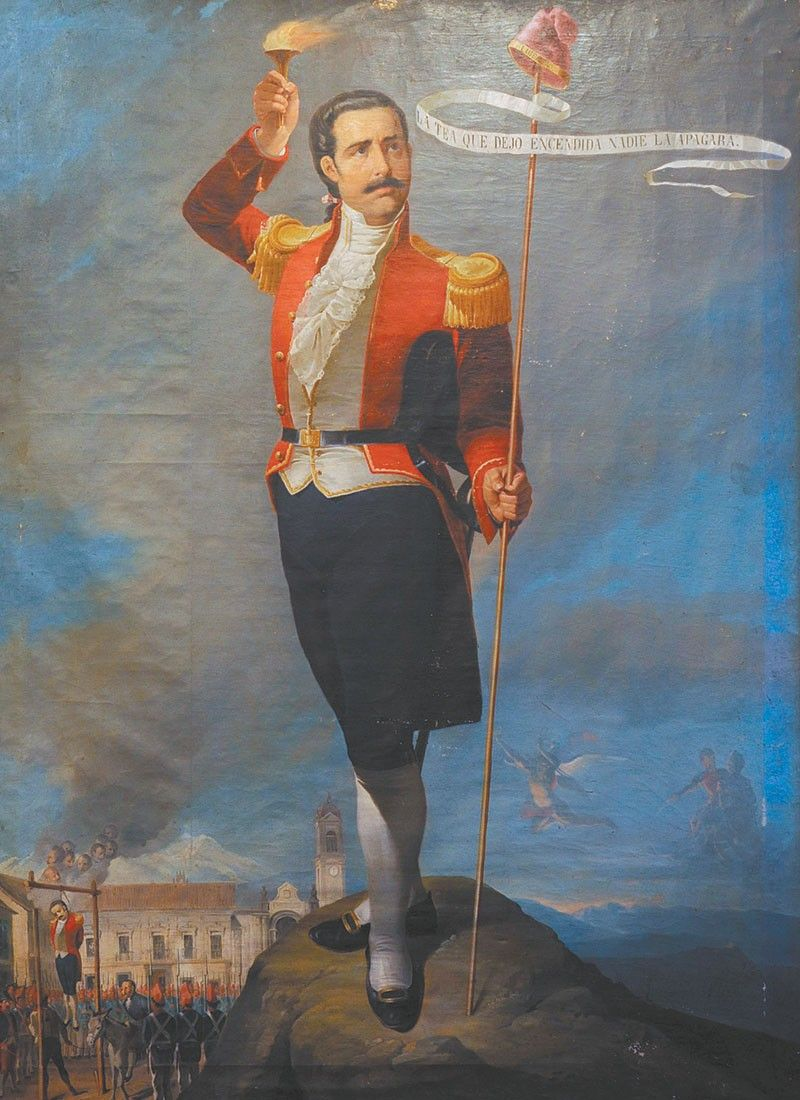
- Murillo in a 1894 artwork

President of the Junta Tuitiva
- In office 16 July 1809 – 30 September 1809

Personal details
- Born: 17 September 1757 La Paz, Viceroyalty of Peru
- Died: 29 January 1810 (aged 52) La Paz, Viceroyalty of the Río de la Plata
- Party: Patriot

Pedro Domingo Murillo (17 September 1757 – 29 January 1810) was a patriot of Upper Peru who played a key role in Bolivia's independence.

== Early life and background ==
On 17 September 1757, Pedro Domingo Murillo was born in the city of La Paz. His father, Juan Ciriaco Murillo, was from one of its elite families, whereas his mother María Ascencia Carrasco was of native pedigree. Juan Ciriaco had been training for priesthood in the catholic church, becoming a priest soon after Pedro's birth. Juan took charge of his education. It is thought Pedro may have attended the Colegio Seminario de San Carlos, in La Paz. At the St Francis Xavier University of Chuquisaca, Pedro then studied law, but left before completing. By age 21, he had married Manuela Josefa de la Concha y Olmedo in Potosí, the high-altitude silver mining city at the foot of Cerro de Potosí. Within 3 years the family, with at least two children, had moved to Irupana.

From the earliest colonial days, the control of upper Peru by the Spanish crown had been firm. Late 1780 saw the Rebellion of Túpac Amaru II. In helping to vanquish this Murillo distinguished himself, and was appointed Lieutenant of the Militia.

Within 5 years, Juan Ciriaco Murillo had died, leaving most of his fortune to Pedro's children. His paternal aunt, Catalina Felipa Murillo Salazar, filed a lawsuit disputing this. At first, this was defeated. However, in papers submitted to court, Murillo falsely claimed a degree in law.

This deception had been achieved with some cunning. First, Pedro abused the goodwill of a rector at St Francis Xavier University of Chuquisaca. The date set to take the examination is known only to the Attorney General of the colonial government, Real Audiencia. Murillo claimed his submission had been via the Notary Sebastian del Toro, who worked regularly for members of the Real Audiencia. The certificate had been submitted days ago, the day "forgotten." Though with no certificate, Murillo asserted he had performed brilliantly in the examination, and had obtained his law degree. A year later in La Paz, Murillo was denounced as having forged his licence to practice law. Challenged by Judge Sebastian Segurola, a friend, to present the original certificate, Murillo simply disappeared. A search at his home revealed documents falsified in Murillo's handwriting. Forged by him had been the signatures of as many as four notaries, as they each subsequently attested.

In the case against his aunt, the truth surfaced. Murillo not only lost the case, but his falsely attested profession had also been in contempt of court. He had to flee the authorities. Pardoned by early 1789, he tried his hand in mining.

== Rebellion against Spanish Empire ==
Concern arose throughout Spanish South America when French forces back in Spain, led by Bonaparte, forced the fall of Ferdinand VII; what seemed the usurping of the Spanish crown by Napoleon's brother Joseph. Memories also smoldered of the violent suppression 30 years earlier of grievances from indigenous communities in upper Peru. In 1805, Murillo was part of a group conspiring against the Spanish government, but was discovered and brought to trial.

Upper Peru regional government in Chuquisaca, the Real Audiencia of Charcas, became uneasy about the loyalties of the local governor. Supported by the faculty of the St Francis Xavier University of Chuquisaca, they deposed him and formed a junta on 25 May 1809. With the King impeded from reigning, logic suggested the Indies should govern themselves. A self-determination movement kicked off with the incessant ringing of the bell of the St Francis Xavier Basilica in Chuquisaca (nowadays Sucre). Meanwhile, Murillo was plotting back in La Paz, leading to the La Paz Revolution 16 July. At a self-appointed Junta Tuitiva ("protecting junta") there a few days later, Murillo demanded nothing less than the secession of upper Peru from the Spanish Empire. He is said to have claimed the revolution was 'igniting a lamp that nobody would be able to extinguish'. This touches on an unresolved point (see historiography at Chuquisaca Revolution). By some in Bolivia (but not in Ecuador) the moment is claimed as the spark that lit the Liberation of South America from Spain (Primer grito libertario).

To suppress what had become a serious insurrection, royalist troops were despatched, some from the Viceroyalty of Peru and others from Buenos Aires. Though some regiments comprising natives refused to intervene against an avowedly patriotic movement, the uprising was repressed. Murillo had to flee, but was captured. He was hanged, along with others, on 29 January 1810, where he made the following statement:

Compatriots, I die, but tyrants won't be able to extinguish the torch I ignited. Long live freedom!

== Legacy ==
Every 16 July in La Paz, the local populace honours what are regarded as patriotic deeds of 1809. A regional celebration begins when the various national and local authorities collaborate to light the Torch of Liberty at what is dubbed the house of the martyr. There follows a parade through central La Paz. Their own torches symbolising the one Murillo claimed to have ignited, citizens form the "Parade of Torches."

== See also ==
- Bust of Pedro Domingo Murillo

== Bibliography ==
- Cabrera, José Ramón Muñoz (1869). Galería de hombres célebres de Bolivia. Santiago: José Domingo Cortés.
