= Charles Gibson Connell =

Scottish advocate and ornithologist

Sir Charles Gibson Connell WS FRSE LLD FRZSS (11 March 1899 – 26 February 1985) was a Scottish advocate and ornithologist. He was founder and President of the Scottish Wildlife Trust.

== Life ==
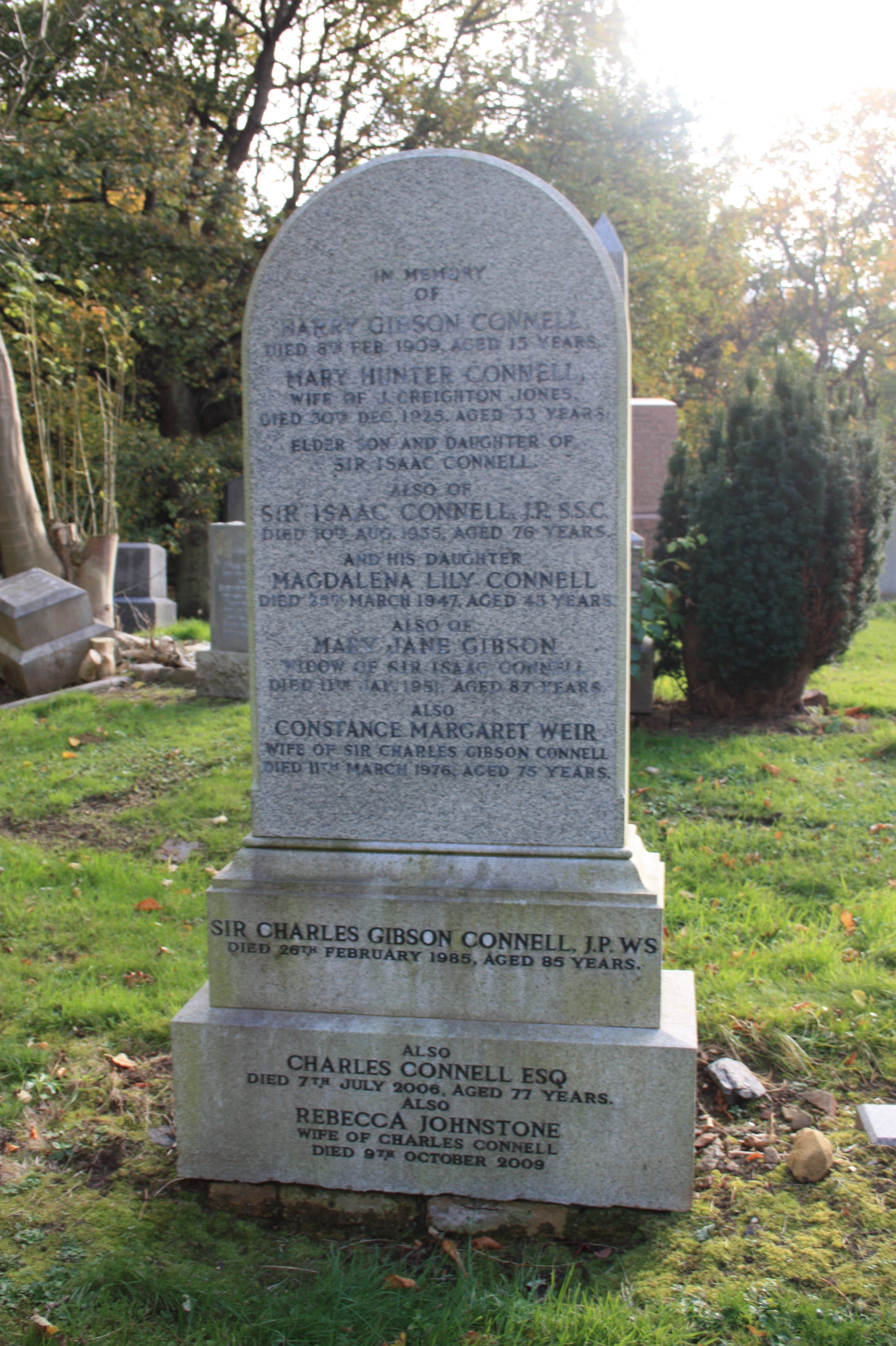
The grave of Charles Gibson Connell, Newington Cemetery, Edinburgh

He was born in Edinburgh at 13 Cameron Park, on 11 March 1899, the son of Mary Jane Gibson and Sir Isaac Connell SSC. He was educated at the Edinburgh Institution (now Stewart Melville's College). His training was interrupted by the First World War during which he served in the Royal Field Artillery as a 2nd Lieutenant in Salonica 1917–1919.

He qualified with a BL at the University of Edinburgh in 1923 and was placed as a legal partner in his family firm of Connell & Connell. In 1936 he joined the Scottish Ornithologist Club, serving as their President from 1957 to 1960. In 1964 he co-founded the Scottish Wildlife Trust and served as their President. He was also Chairman of the Council for Nature. In 1965 he was elected a Fellow of the Royal Society of Edinburgh, his proposers included George Waterston.

Connell was knighted in 1952. In 1976 the University of Dundee awarded him an honorary doctorate (LLD).

Charles Gibson Connell died on 26 February 1985 and is buried with his parents in Newington Cemetery in southern Edinburgh, opposite his family home on Cameron Park. The grave lies on the northern side of the main roundel opposite the entrance.

== Publications ==
- Connell on the Agriculture Holdings (Scotland) Acts

== Family ==
In 1927 he married Constance Margaret Weir (d.1976).
