= Bust of Pedro Domingo Murillo =

Sculpture in Mexico City, Mexico

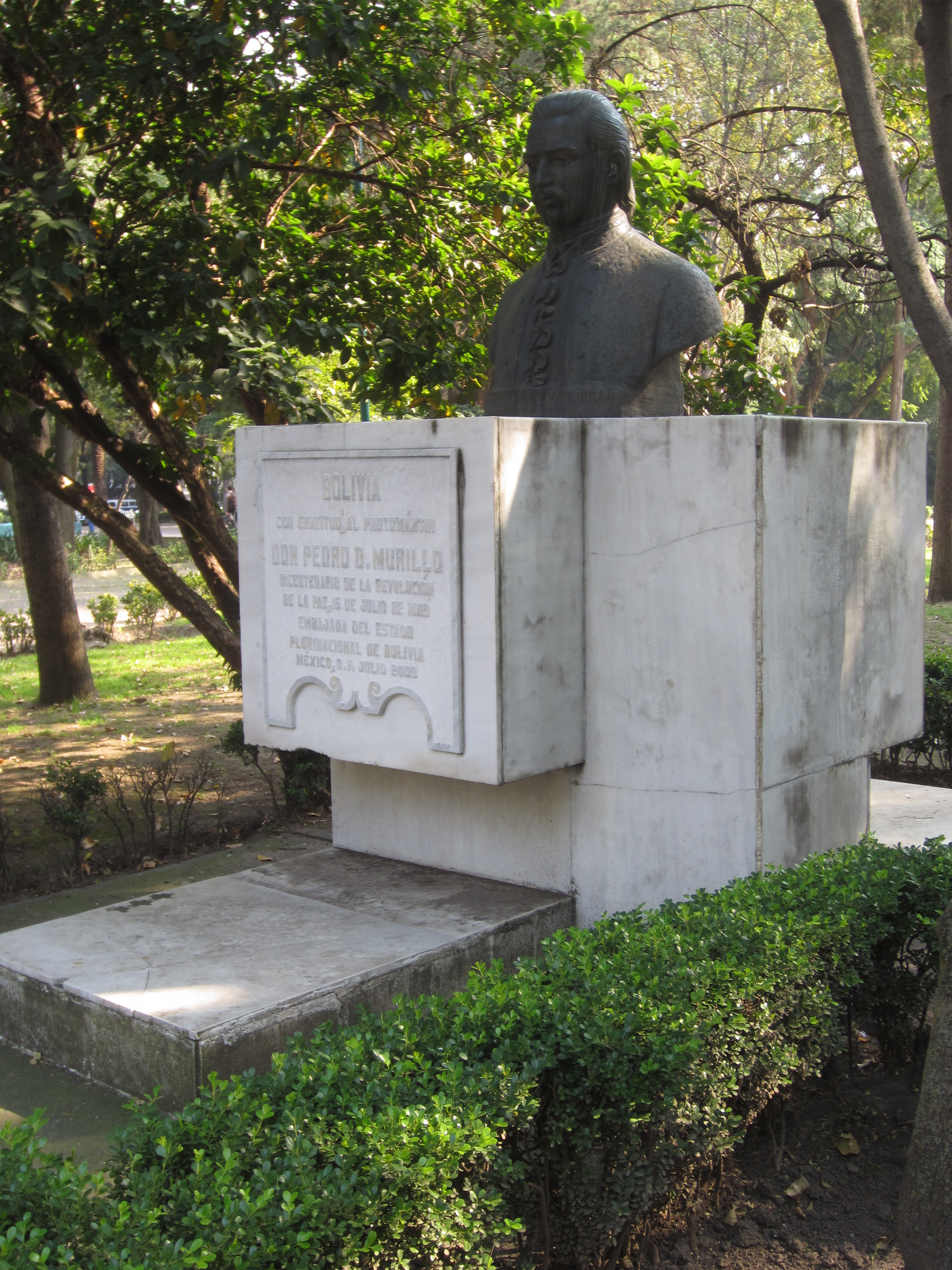
- The bust in 2018
- Subject: Pedro Domingo Murillo
- Location: Mexico City; 19°26′3.3″N 99°11′47.6″W

The bust of Pedro Domingo Murillo is installed in Mexico City's American Park, in Mexico. The sculpture commemorates the bicentennial of the Bolivian revolution.
