= Palliser's Cottage Home No. 35 =

Coordinates: 41.6910°N 87.6794°W

2314 W. 111th Place - Morgan Park

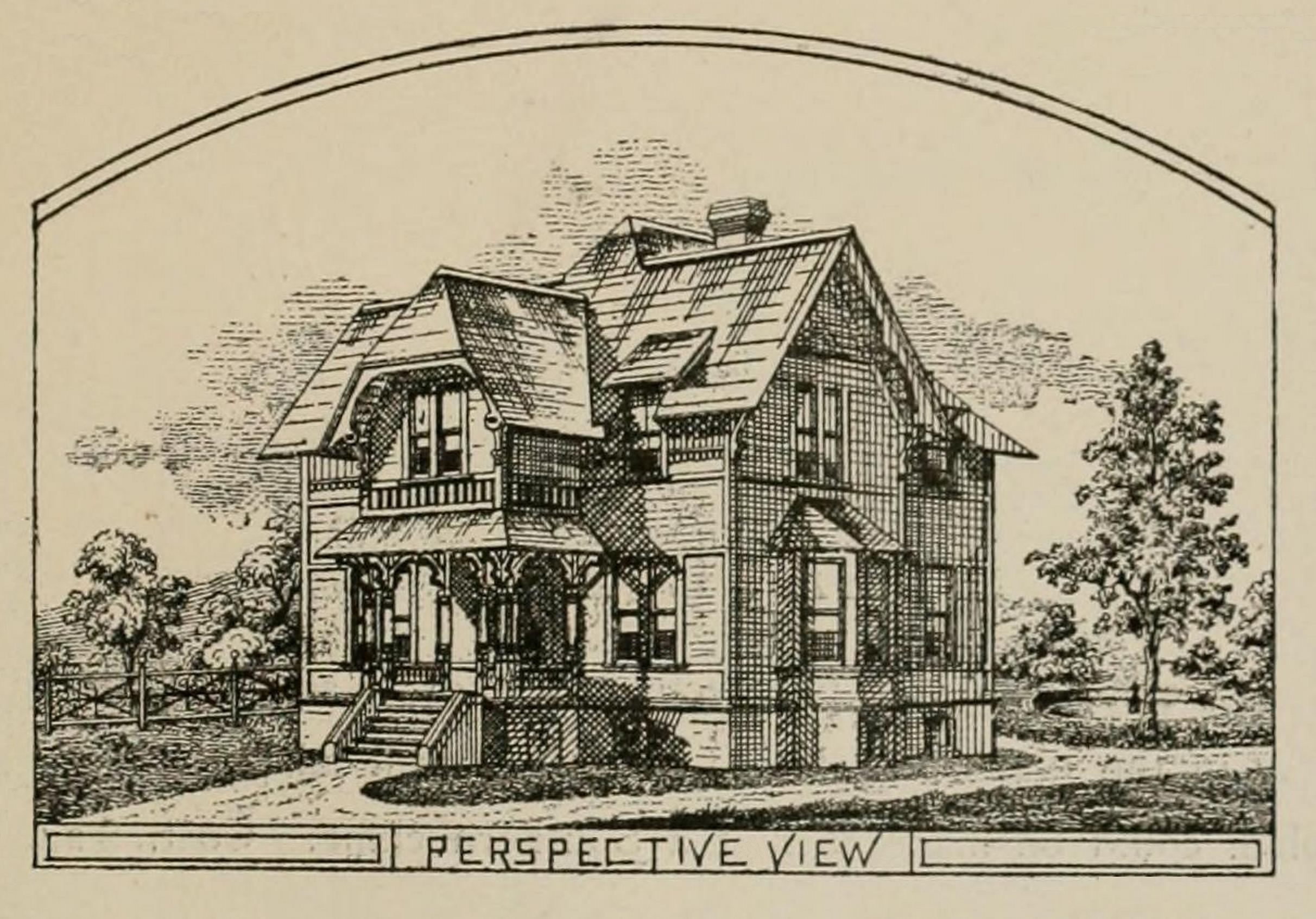
Image from the pattern book, plate 25

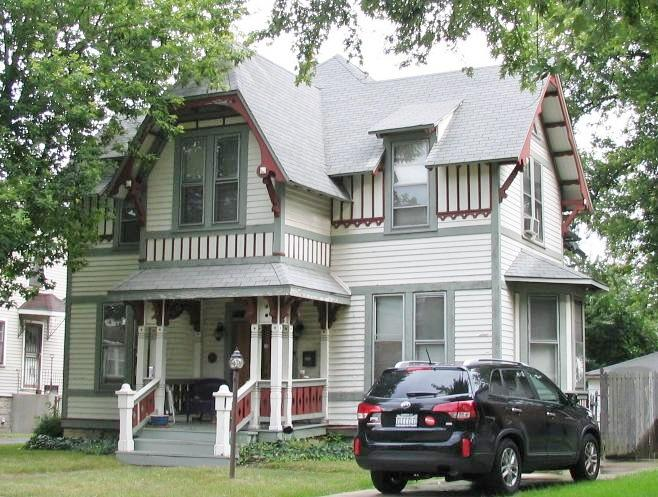
The house as it appears today.

Palliser, Palliser & Co. – Design 35 – from Palliser’s American Cottage Homes - 1878

The Palliser's Cottage Home No. 35 is a Stick Style house at 2314 West 111th Place in the Morgan Park neighborhood of Chicago, Illinois, United States. Plans for the house appeared in the pattern book of Palliser, Palliser & Co. in 1878 and this house was built in 1882 for Rev. Johan Edgren. It was designated a Chicago Landmark on February 16, 2000.
