= La Paz revolution =

1809 uprising against Spanish rule in La Paz, Upper Peru (present-day Bolivia)

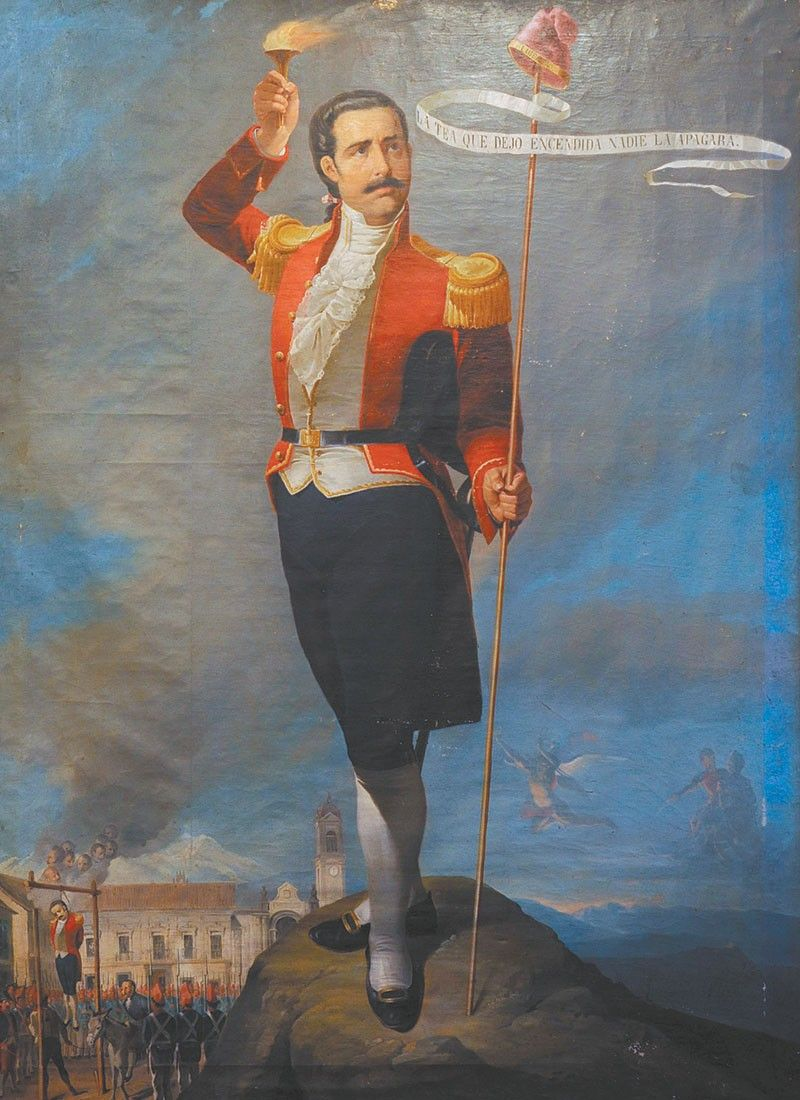
- Pedro Murillo, leader of the revolution.
- Date: July 16, 1809
- Location: La Paz, Upper Peru (modern Bolivia)
- Participants: Criollos from La Paz
- Outcome: Temporary removal of Spanish authorities and declaration of independence. Spanish rule restored by Goyeneche

The City of La Paz is located in the highlands of Upper Peru, located in what is known today as Bolivia. This area became the center of a political upheaval in 1809. In July a coalition of local elites, militia officers, and urban residents overthrew the Spanish colonial authorities and established a governing body known as the Junta Tuitiva. This movement claimed that it was not completely independent from the Spanish monarchy. They asserted that sovereignty had returned to the people of Upper Peru. The La Paz uprising is one of the earliest and most radical uprisings in Upper Peru. This Revolution would become part of the larger Bolivian War of Independence.

== Background ==
La Paz is located in a region dominated by the mining industry. The biggest export was silver. This mining market would soon dry up and by the late 1700s and early 1800s mining output began to decline dramatically. This would cause widespread poverty and instability. Even though La Paz was mainly just an export town, it began to feel the effects of the downturn of the economy in the region. This is because they were dependent on supplying goods to the mining centers, transporting the silver, and the labor systems that were involved in mining economies. Due to this economic downturn the city’s merchants, mule drivers, artisans, and landowners all suffered. This would start to fuel frustration within society surrounding the economy, social stress, and anxiety.

There was also chronic instability due to the relations with indigenous people in Upper Peru. This system was unstable because when the economy went down, indigenous communities became stressed which would affect the entire economy of the region. Beyond economic relations with the indigenous people, there were also multiple insurrections in which the indigenous people clashed with the Spanish forces. Revolutions such as the Rebellion of Túpac Amaru II were broken by the late 1780s, however both the Creoles and Indigenous people drew different conclusions. The Indigenous people realized that they had seen their best chance at political independence within the Andes, forcing their vision for self rule to small community autonomy. The creoles on the other hand, had witnessed the impressive indigenous revolution and now realized the potential consequences of unleashing it in the future. However, later in 1809 the creoles would occupy a valuable strategic position within society by being able to assume leadership positions. They realized that metropolitan control was vulnerable and the indigenous initiative would not be sufficient to resolve the issues by itself. This allowed Creole to assume leadership roles and be able to gain greater autonomy and political representation.

In 1808, due to his unpopularity, Charles IV was forced to abdicate the throne in Spain. This unpopularity is mainly due to Spanish losses during the Napoleonic Wars. After Charles IV abdicated the throne, his son, Ferdinand VII, took over as King of Spain in March 1808. At this point, Napoleon's armies were already entering Spain. This unstable environment allowed Napoleon to exploit them and force Ferdinand to abdicate the throne as well. This collapse of the monarchy allowed many local communities in the Spanish empire to act independently.

One of which was the Chuquisaca Revolution, which was the earliest uprising in Upper Peru following the abdication of the Spanish Throne. On May 25, 1809, local elites, law students, and clergy members in Chuquisaca pressured the Spanish president, Ramón García Pizarro, to resign. After this resignation, the Cabildo and Audiencia gained power in Chuquisaca. This eventually led to the creation of the Chuquisaca Junta. They were not completely separatist because they still claimed loyalty to Ferdinand VII. They also insisted that people had the right to protect the royal authority from Napoleon. Due to this being the first revolution in Upper Peru, it created the climate that led to the La Paz Revolution two months later. This revolution started the trend that is seen in La Paz, where the local community believes that in the absence of the king, political authority could revert to the local community. They are different, though, due to the reasons why they revolted against the government. The main reason that La Paz revolted was to give the power to the people and get it away from any sort of monarchical power. In Chuquisaca, the main reason was that they did not want Napoleon to control them.

== Outbreak of the Revolution ==
On July 16, in the city of La Paz, as celebrations for the Virgin of Carmen were unfolding, a group of revolutionaries, led by Colonel Pedro Domingo Murillo, and other individuals besieged the city barracks and forced Governor Tadeo Davila and the Bishop of La Paz, Remigio de la Santa y Ortega, to resign. On July 16, 1809, a mestizo, Pedro Domingo Murillo, famously said that the Bolivian Revolution was igniting a lamp that nobody would be able to extinguish. Many historians agree that the beginning of the independence of South America from Spain was. Political power went to the local cabildo until the "Junta Tutelar de los Derechos del Pueblo" ("Junta keeping the Rights of the People"), headed by Murillo, was formed. On July 27, the junta proclaimed colonial independence.

Similar to the Chuquisaca Revolution, the La Paz revolution was a direct response to the collapse of royal authority in Spain. Cabildos, Audiencias, and local elites began asserting authority normally held by the king. There were also, at the time, many other factors that caused the climate in which a revolution could happen, other than the absence of a proper monarchical authority. In this Period of time, La Paz was already going under immense economic strain, mismanagement from local officials, and anger at the colonial officials among the people in La Paz. This vacuum left by the lack of a monarchy made the locals in La Paz receptive to the idea of creating an alternative government. This created an environment in which people wanted a change in government, and the absence of the king created a perfect environment for that change. In this Period of time, La Paz was already going under immense economic strain, mismanagement from local officials, and anger at the colonial officials among the people in La Paz. This vacuum left by the lack of a monarchy made the locals in La Paz receptive to the idea of creating an alternative government. This led to a group in La Paz forming that had the goal to remove the corrupt colonial administration and create a government that was able to rule based on local interests. This group included Creole elites, lawyers, urban militia officers, and influential clergy. They coordinated together and deposed the existing colonial authorities and installed their own government, named Junta Tuitiva de los Derechos del Pueblo. This name translates to Protective Junta of the Rights of the People, showing that there was not a monarch in charge, but rather the government was run by the people. They were able to take control of the government by taking control of many key urban institutions, including barracks and public buildings. This is something that La Paz took from other early revolutionary movements like Chuquisaca. Taking control of barracks and public buildings was characteristic of the earliest revolutionary movements and was common for establishing a functioning junta. The control of the Barracks meant that Junta Tuitiva was able to enforce their opinions and enabled them to resist Spanish attempts to counter them.

The Junta was not always an equal share between each of the main ruling parties. Due to this, there were several competing factions within the Junta. One example of this is Murillo's Circle. This was the group of people surrounding Pedro Domingo Murillo after they won. This group was much more radical than other parts of the Junta Tuitiva. They believed that the Crisis of the monarchy justified broad Spanish-American autonomy, sovereignty should shift towards the people of Spanish America rather than the Spanish monarchy, and finally, they believed that the junta should take decisive military action, mobilize militias, and expand the revolution into neighboring towns. This group of people favored mobilizing the population, spreading the insurgency, and framing the movement more towards the people. Another faction inside the Junuta Tuitiva was a group that was more moderate. They believed that Upper Peru should remain loyal to Ferdinand VII and that the authority of the Junta Tuitiva should only be temporary. Unlike the people in Murillo's circle, they wanted to avoid provoking large-scale royal retaliation, and that the language of the Junta should remain cautious and legalistic. They did not want to completely reject the revolution, but rather they wanted it to be framed as constitutional and temporary. These two factions inside the junta Tuitiva came from two different social networks. Members of the loyalist faction came from elite Creole families, militia officers, clergymen, and lawyers. People who agreed with Murillo's more radical view of how the Junta Tuitiva should operate were just people who were influenced by Enlightenment political ideas and anti-colonial sentiment fueled by local crisis. Though yes, there were many disagreements on subjects such as how far the Junta should push autonomy, whether to expand the uprising, and how to respond to the royalist threats, they still all stayed unified. There were no breakaway factions, and they stayed together.

One important contribution that the Junta made was an early proclamation of Latin American independence, the first to do so in Latin America. Led by the Murillo, the Junta proclaimed, "Compatriots: Until now we have tolerated a sort of exile within the breast of our own country. We have looked on with indifference for more than three centuries as our primitive liberty was subject to the despotism and tyranny of an unusual usurper who, degrading is among mankind, has looked upon us as slaves. We have kept a silence closely resembling stupidity ". However, while this has been claimed to be one of the first documents claiming independence, it has been disputed for being fabricated between 1840 and 1896, much longer after the 1809 revolution. The legend of this radicalized declaration may have stemmed from the rivalry between La Paz and Sucre over who had started the revolutions first. However, it is still disputed, but indicated that revolution may have been less radical than presented.

Though the Junta Tuitiva claimed they represented the people, many royalist authorities copied this and claimed that they were there for the people. At this time, Spanish Political Theory held that sovereignty ultimately rested in the nation or the people when the king could not rule. The royalist used this doctrine to justify their rule. Royalist officials claimed that they were defending the Spanish Nation against French rule. They also claimed that they were preserving the unity of the catholic people. Finally, they claimed that their rule was necessary to protect the empire from political fragmentation. They presented themselves as the legal representative of the broader Spanish people. At the same time, they portrayed the Junta Tuitiva as dangerous local factions who were trying to break the unity of Spanish America. In royalist eyes, the Junta Tuitiva would only bring about a civil war, economic collapse, and attacks on ordinary people. Because of this, they framed themselves as defenders of order, stability, and the interests of the general population. They claimed that the Junta Tuitiva was against the will of the people. They believed that the people spoke through the legitimate institutions of the monarchy, not through unauthorized juntas. They would also portray themselves as protectors of indigenous communities, and they argued that rebellion would only cause indigenous suffering. They would use narratives like these to undermine the Junta Tuitiva.

Eventually, this would lead to the fall of the Junta Tuitiva, who were only in power for three months. The response was led by Jose Manuel de Goyneche. Goyneche would advance towards La Paz, and on the way, he was able to gain support from loyalists in the southern highlands. He was also able to gather indigenous militias. When Goyeneche reached the vicinity of La Paz in late October 1809, the junta attempted limited resistance but was quickly overwhelmed. The Junta Tuitiva fell so easily due to the lack of heavy arms and manpower. They were not able to gain the support from many other regions, and the only group that may have allied with them, the Chuquisaca, had already been suppressed at this point. Also, many supports fled as soon as they realized the size of the forces that were involved. After the capture of La Paz, many of the rulers of the Junta Tuitiva were arrested and executed. Some prominent leaders who were executed are Pedro Domingo Murillo, Juan Basilio Catacora, and Mariano Graneros. One famous quote said by Murillo before his death is “La tea que dejo encendida nadie la podrá apagar.”

== Effects and Legacy of the Revolution ==
While the La Paz Revolution in 1809 failed and was defeated by the Spanish forces operating out of Buenos Aires, this did not mean the revolution died with it. One year later, Buenos Aires revolted against the Viceroyalty of the Río de la Plata. During the May Revolution, the Spanish backed Viceroyalty of Peru saw an opportunity to claim the area and acted on it. However, Some people in Buenos Aires did not want to cede power back to Lima and the Viceroyalty. One of the main reasons that Upper Peru and La Paz was so contested was the fact that Upper Peru had economic value as it produced up to 60% of all silver in Latin America at the time.

Furthermore, its mountainous terrain made it an ideal location to conduct a guerilla warfare style campaign making it a source of potential resistance. During this time, effects of the failed 1809 La Paz revolution were still evident. The revolution left deep divides among social classes as the Creoles aristocracy refused to accept the social hierarchy in which they were vastly outnumbered by Indigenous peoples and Mestizo population. This made it difficult for revolutionaries attempting to form an independence movement due to the infighting already occurring. Among other factors that made it difficult to fight for independence was the vast military resources of the Viceroyalty of Peru. However one advantage to the revolutionaries was the geography of the region making it hard for the large forces from Lima to move though the area, exposing them to guerilla attacks. These factors made it difficult to secure Upper Peru for either side.

== See also ==
- Bolivian War of Independence
- Chuquisaca Revolution
- May Revolution
- History of Bolivia
