= James Caw =

Sir James Lewis Caw LLD HRSA (25 September 1864 – 5 December 1950) was a Scottish art historian, critic and gallery director. He argued for the existence of an independent and free-standing "Scottish school of painting" arising in the second half of the 19th century.

== Life ==
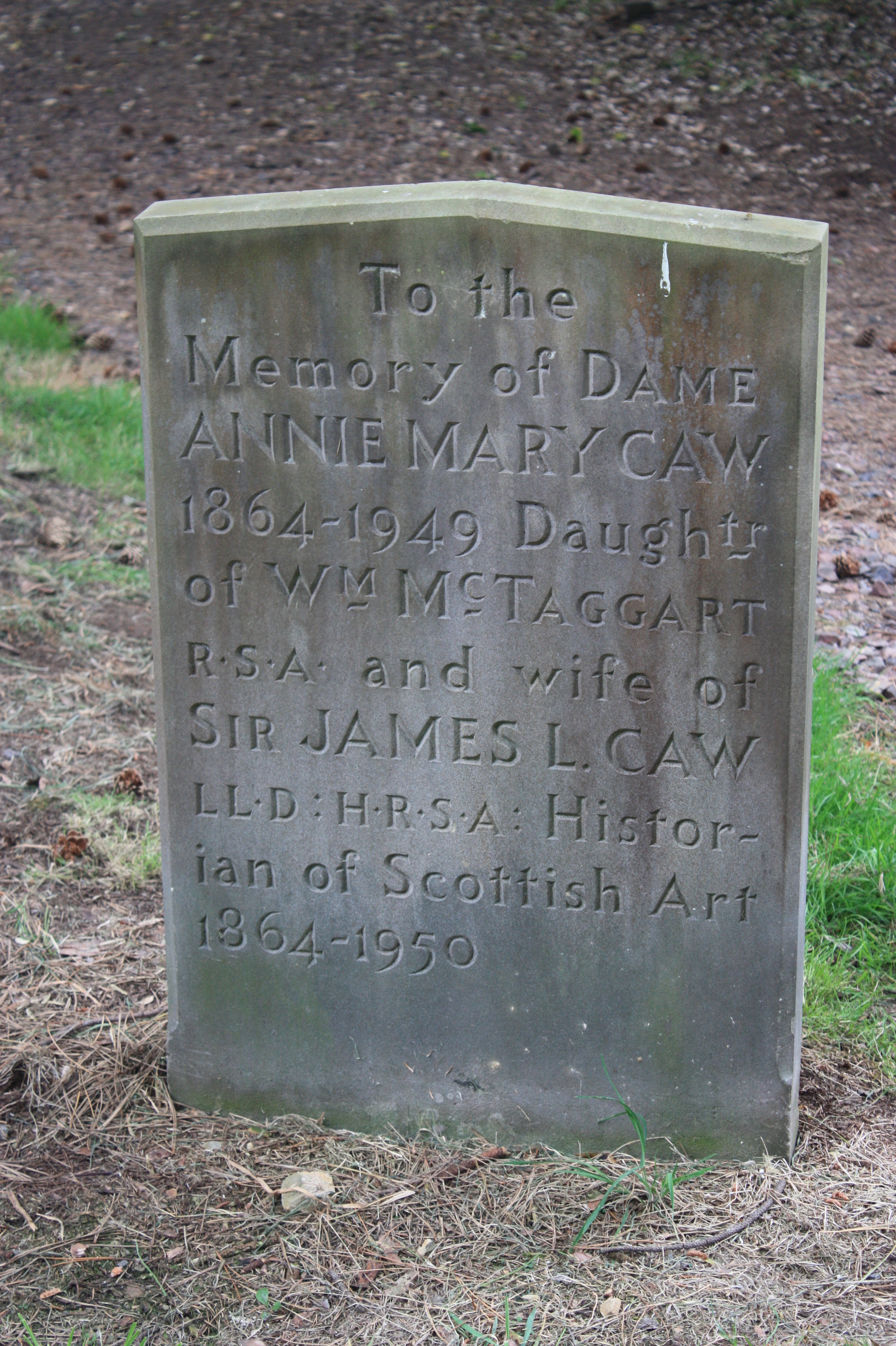
The grave of Sir James Caw, Newington Cemetery, Edinburgh

Caw was born in Ayr, the son of James Caw, a draper, and his wife Eliza Murray Greenfield. After study at Ayr Academy, he became an apprentice engineer at the West of Scotland Technical College in Ayr. He then worked from 1887 as an engineering draughtsman, initially in Glasgow.

Caw was introduced to the Scottish art world in the early 1880s by James Guthrie, and made significant friendships, in particular with some of the Glasgow Boys. He began work at the Scottish National Portrait Gallery in 1885; in 1907 he became the initial director of the National Galleries of Scotland. He was a member of the Scottish Arts Club.

In 1931 Caw was knighted. He died at his home in Lasswade on 5 December 1950. He is buried in Newington Cemetery in south Edinburgh.

== Works ==
Caw is considered the major historian of Scottish art of the first half of the 20th century. He wrote an ambitious survey entitled Scottish Painting Past and Present 1620 - 1908 (1908). Works on individual artists include:

- Portraits by Sir Henry Raeburn (1909)
- William McTaggart, R.S.A., V.P.R.S.W.: A Biography and an Appreciation (1917)
- Sir James Guthrie, a Biography (1932)

Himself a watercolour painter, Caw exhibited from 1887 to 1922.

== Family ==
Caw married in 1909 Anne Mary McTaggart, daughter of William McTaggart. They had no children.
