= Jean Thomson Harris =

- Born: Jean Thomson; 6 November 1881; Edinburgh
- Died: 9 November 1963 (aged 82); Edinburgh
- Known for: wife of founder of Rotary
- Spouse: Paul P. Harris

Jean Thomson Harris (6 November 1881 – 9 November 1963) was the wife of Paul Harris, a lawyer who founded the first Rotary Club in Chicago in 1905. She supported the organisation but was never allowed to join because she was a woman. She eventually joined the Inner Wheel and she was the first honorary member of the Inner Wheel Club of Edinburgh. Both her birthplace and burial site are commemorated with plaques. She is known internationally.

== Early life ==
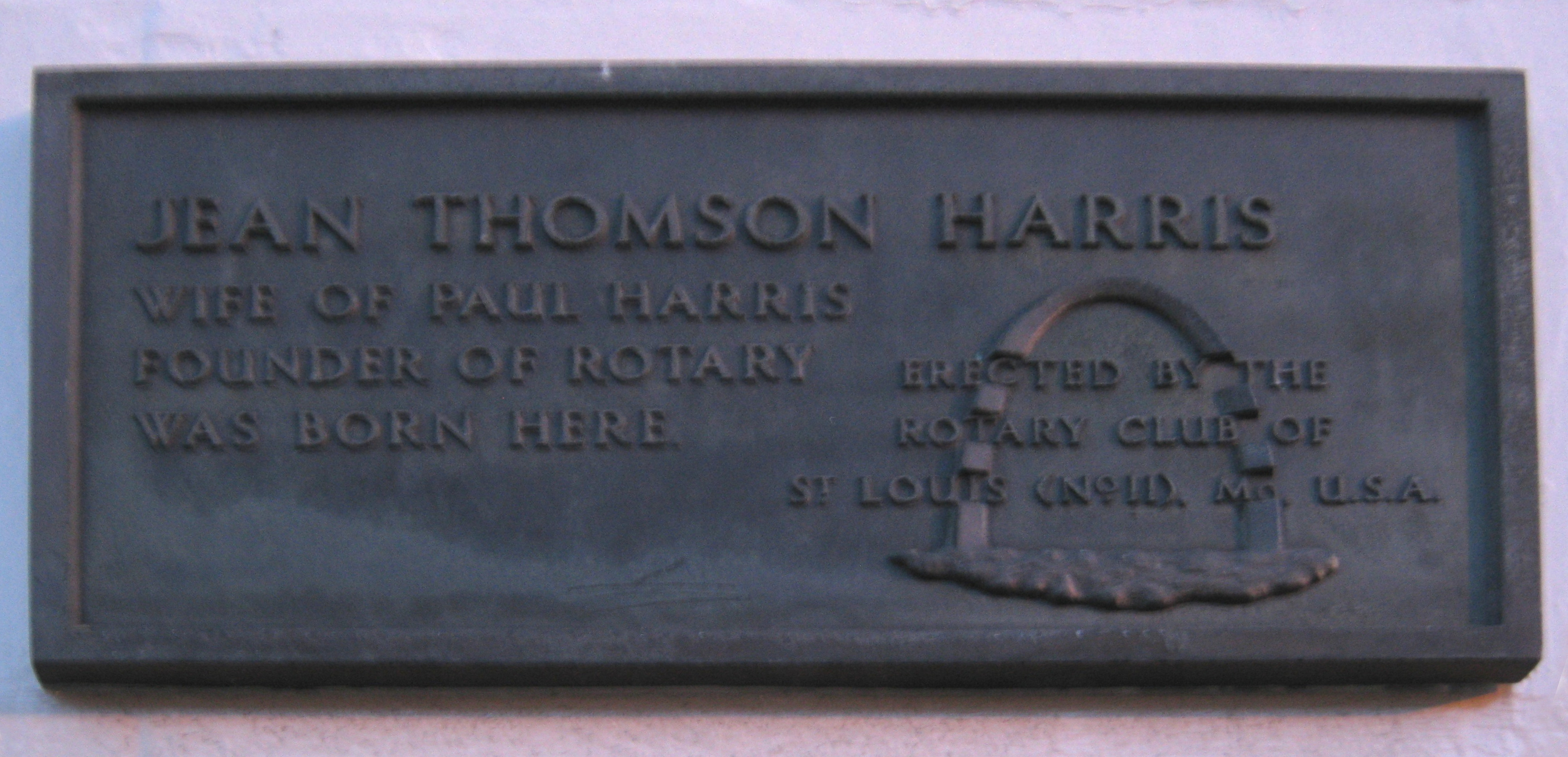
A plaque in Cumberland Street

She was born in 1881 at 9 Cumberland Street, in the New Town of Edinburgh, Scotland. She was the daughter of John Thomson, furniture packer from Logie Pert in Forfarshire and later a minister in the Church of Scotland and his wife Ann Youngson, from Peterhead. The family continued to live in Cumberland Street until 1892, when they rented a flat in the newly built Comely Bank Avenue in Edinburgh.

After leaving school, Jean worked as a lady's maid for a number of families in Edinburgh.

== Married life ==
Along with other members of her family, Jean moved to the US, where her sister already lived, in order to work as a nanny.

In Chicago she met Paul Harris, whom she married on 2 July 1910.

The couple bought a house on Longwood Drive in Morgan Park, a suburb of Chicago, and named it Comely Bank, after the area in Edinburgh where Jean had lived as a child.

== Impact on Rotary ==
A month after their marriage, Paul was elected President of the national Rotary organisation, with Chesley Perry as secretary. Jean recalled "We wives played a very small part at convention in those days; our young men were struggling to find themselves."

When Paul began to take time off from his job as a lawyer to travel to Rotary conventions, Jean accompanied him.

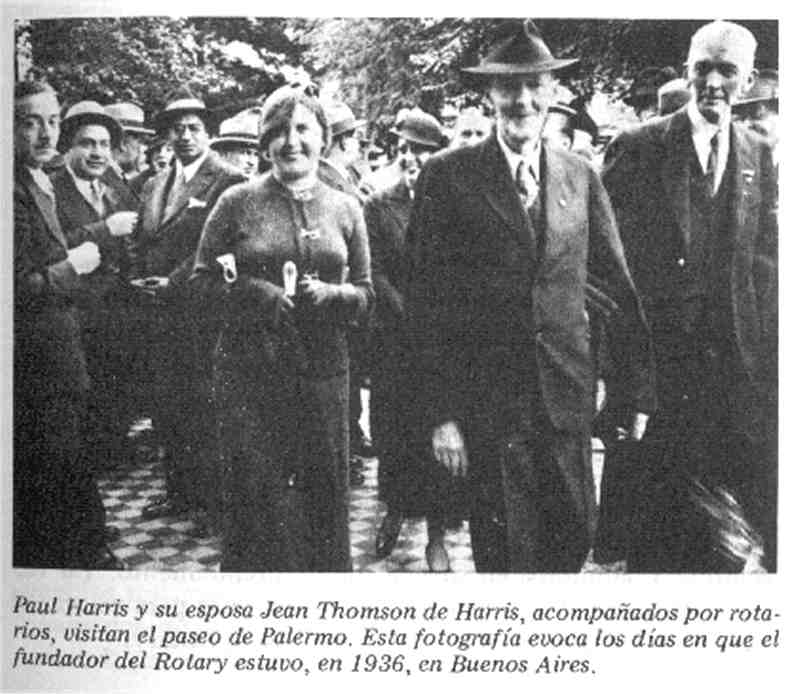
Jean Thomson Harris and Paul Harris in Buenos Aires during a tour of South American clubs

In 1934 Jean and Paul were invited to visit the Rotary Club of Edinburgh, where the Lord Provost invited Paul to speak as guest of honour at the Assembly of the Lord Provosts of Scotland.

Whilst on a Rotary visit to Melbourne, Australia, Paul was tired and asked Jean to speak on his behalf, which she did.

Jean became a member of the Inner Wheel, and in 1946 was made the first honorary member of the Inner Wheel Club of Edinburgh.

== Later life and death ==
After Harris died in 1947, Jean briefly continued to live at Comely Bank but later sold the house. and returned to her native Edinburgh, She died in Scotland on 9 November 1963.

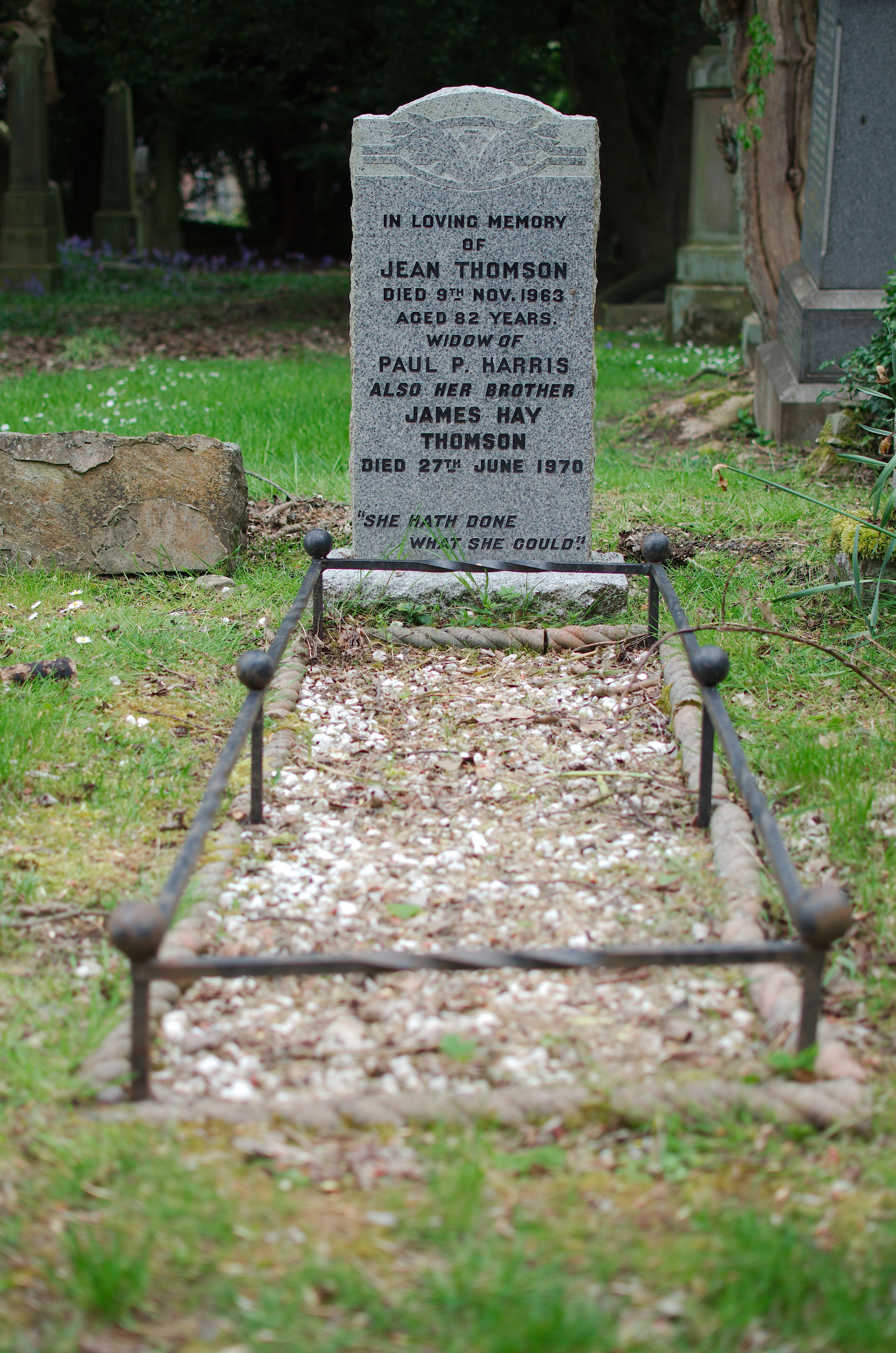
Her grave

She is buried in Newington Cemetery, Edinburgh.

== Memorials ==
A plaque was erected at her birthplace at 9 Cumberland Street, Edinburgh, by the Rotary Club St Louis (No 11), Missouri, US.

Another memorial is found on the gate of Newington Cemetery, Edinburgh, where she is buried.

Jean is mentioned in Rotary literature in many countries.
