= Parque América =

Park in Polanco, Mexico City

American Park
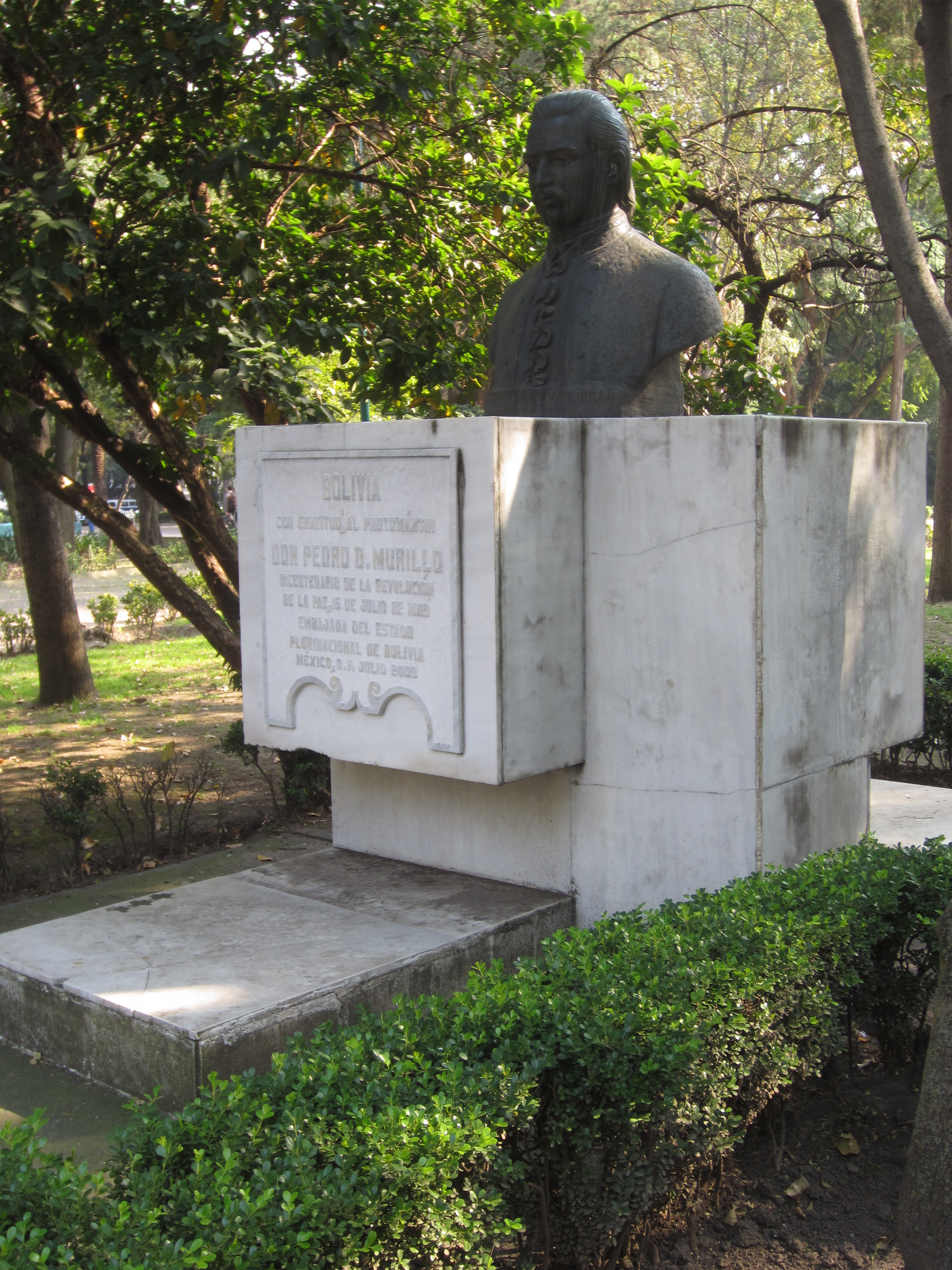
- The bust of Pedro Domingo Murillo in the park in 2018

- Location within Mexico
- Type: Park
- Location: Polanco
- Nearest city: Mexico City
- Coordinates: 19.43397°N 99.1965°W

Parque América is located in Mexico City's Polanco neighborhood. It hosts a bust of Pedro Domingo Murillo that was gifted by the government of Bolivia. A statue of Paul P. Harris, founder of Rotary International, is installed in the park.

The Monument to Christopher Columbus was expected to be placed in the park in 2022, after being removed in 2020 from its original spot at Paseo de la Reforma. Subsequently, it was decided that the statue would be relocated to the National Museum of the Viceroyalty in Tepotzotlán.
