= Statue of Paul P. Harris (Mexico City) =

Statue in Mexico City, Mexico

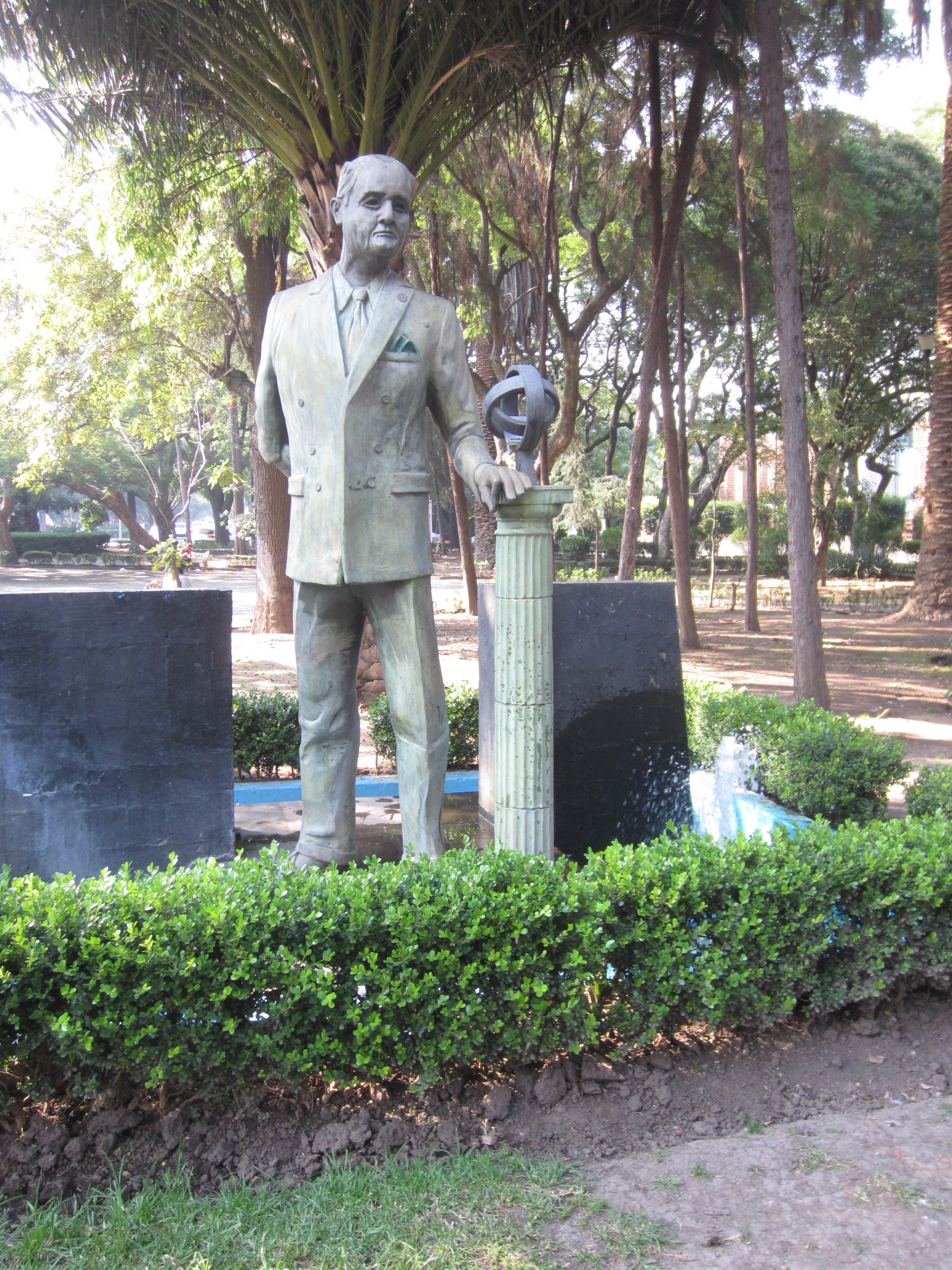
- The statue in 2018
- Subject: Paul P. Harris
- Location: Mexico City, Mexico; 19°26′2.7″N 99°11′48″W

The statue of Paul P. Harris, founder of Rotary International, is installed in Mexico City's Americas Park, in Mexico.
