= List of public art in Mexico City =

List of public artworks in Mexico City, Mexico

There are many public artworks displayed in Mexico City, including murals and outdoor sculptures.

== Murals ==
- Day and Night
- The History of Mexico

== Outdoor sculptures ==
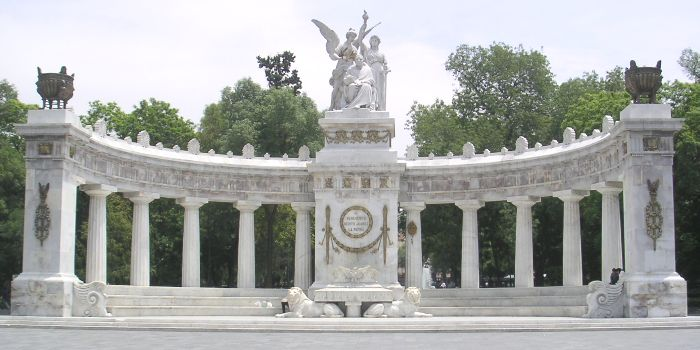
Benito Juárez Hemicycle

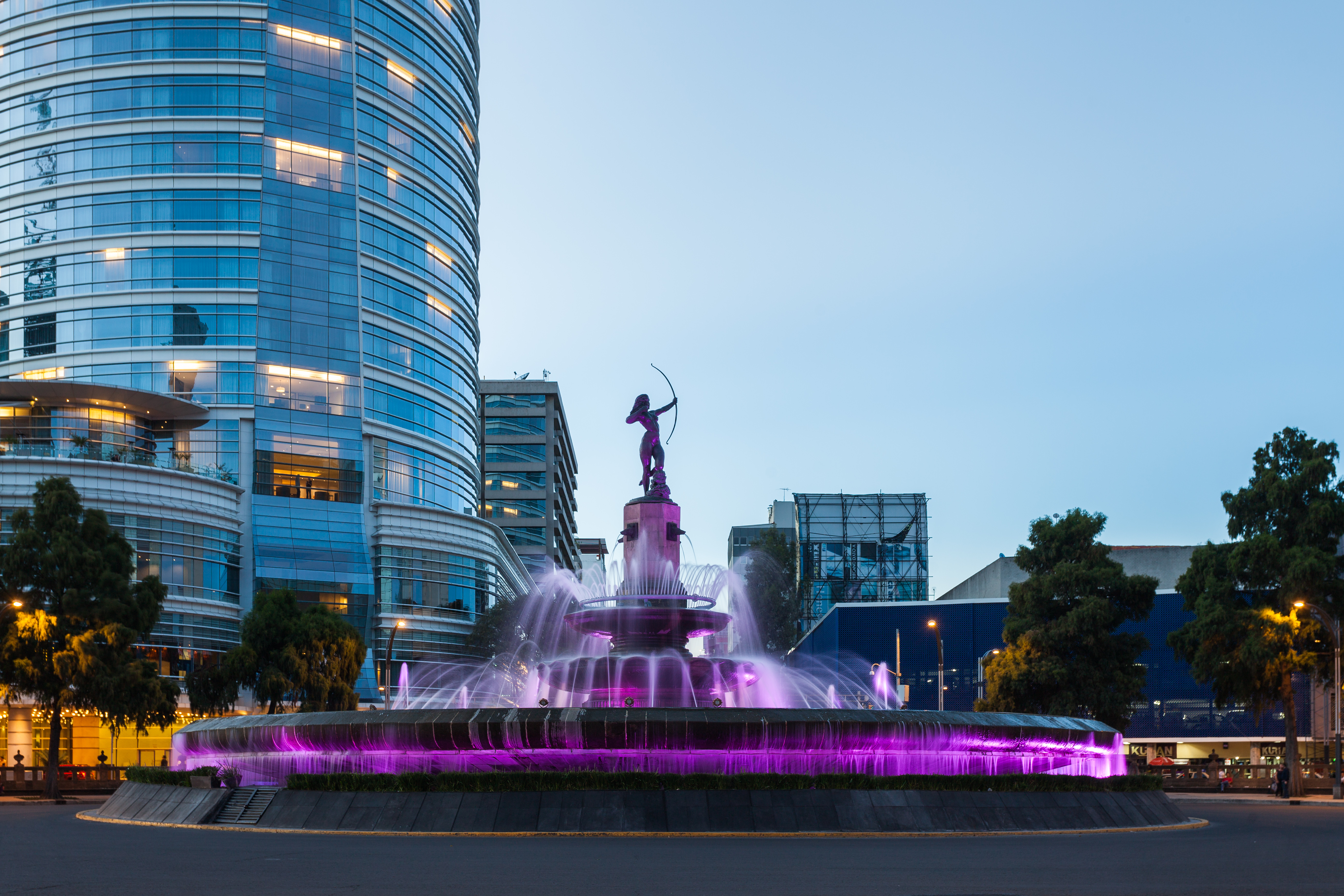
Diana the Huntress Fountain

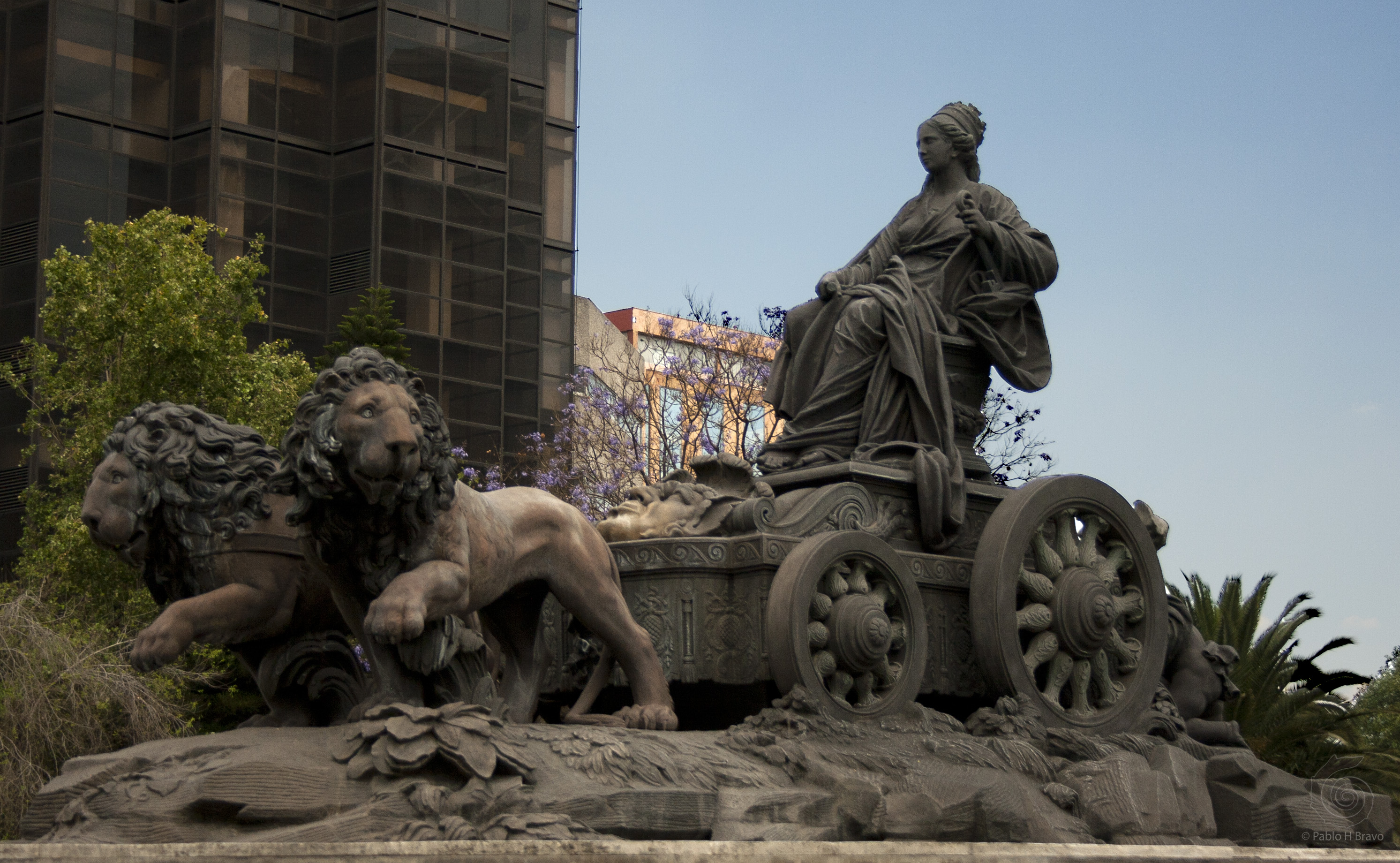
Fuente de Cibeles, 2013

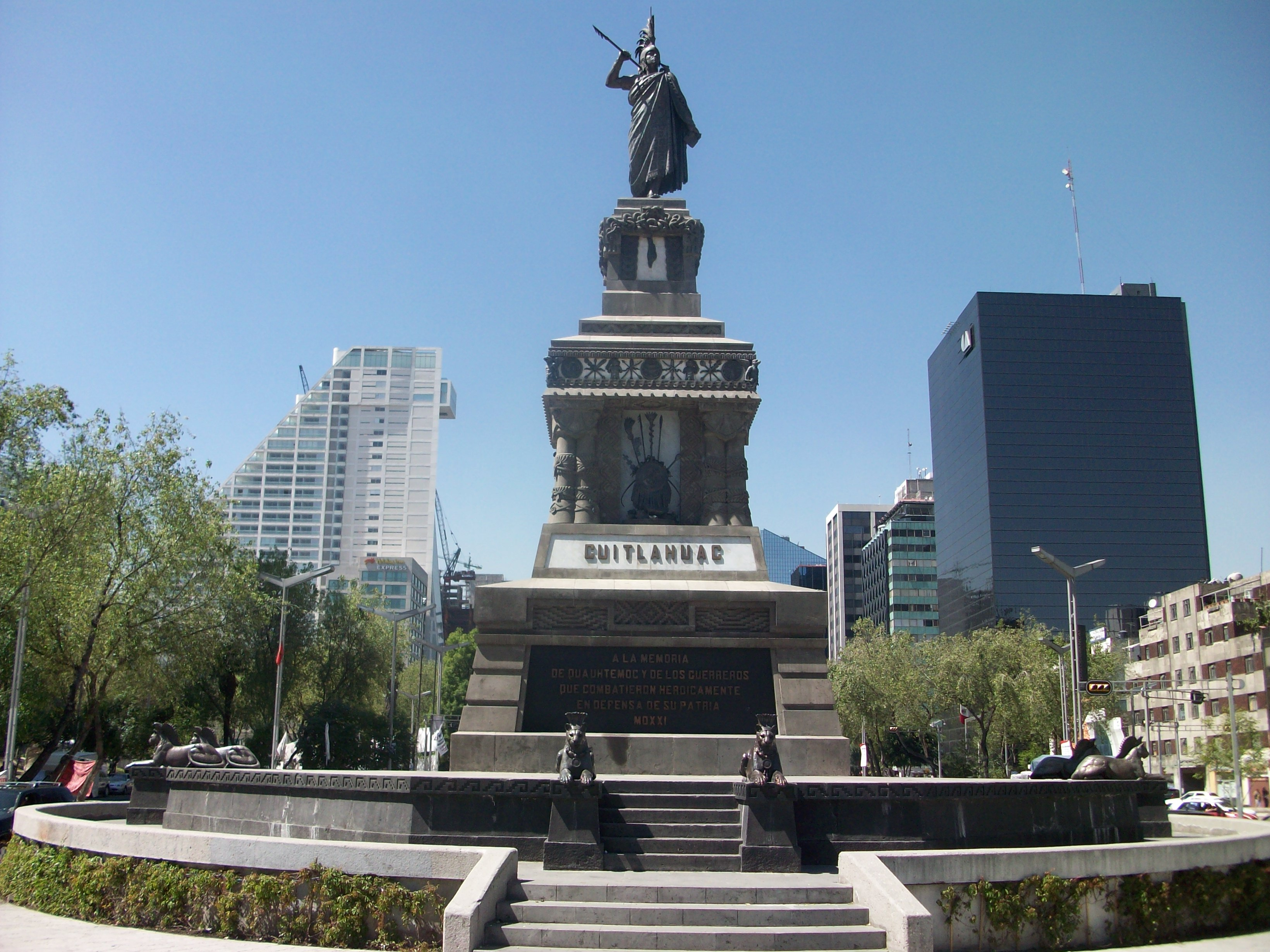
Monument to Cuauhtémoc

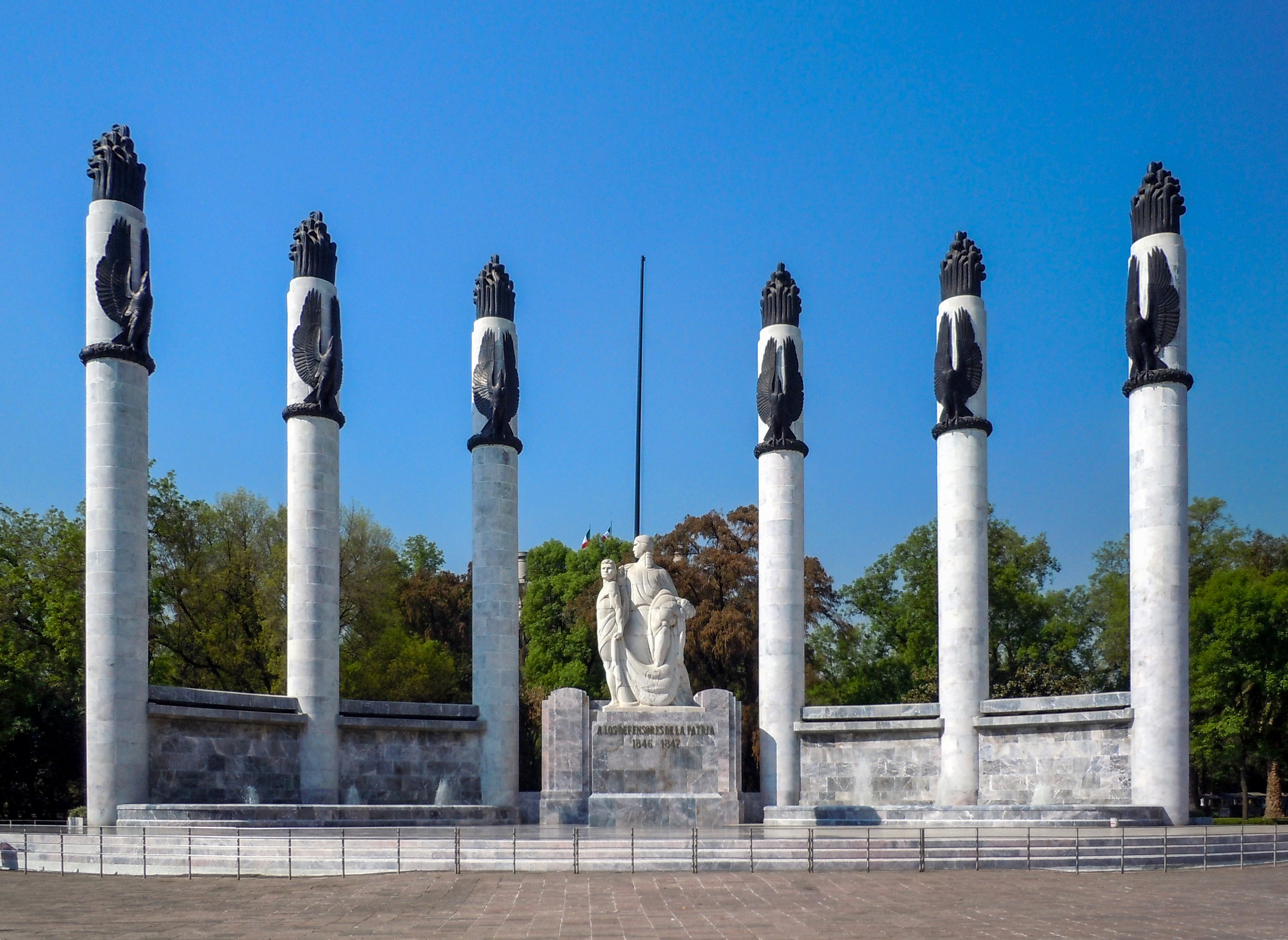
Monumento a los Niños Héroes

- Abraham Lincoln: The Man
- Angel of Independence
- Ariadna abandonada
- Beethoven Monument
- Benito Juárez Hemicycle
- Bust of Albert Einstein
- Bust of Cuauhtémoc
- Bust of Pedro Domingo Murillo
- Canadian totem
- Dolor
- Diana the Huntress Fountain, Paseo de la Reforma
- El Ángel de la Seguridad Social
- El Caballito
- El Sereno
- El Sol Rojo
- Equestrian statue of Charles IV of Spain
- Equestrian statue of Francisco I. Madero
- Flor de Fango (1908)
- Fountain of Mercury, Alameda Central
- Fountain of Neptune, Alameda Central
- Fountain of Venus, Alameda Central
- Fountain of Virgin, Alameda Central
- Fountain to Bartolomé de las Casas
- Fuente de Cibeles
- Fuente de los Cántaros
- Gladiador frigio
- Gladiador romano
- How Doth the Little Crocodile, Paseo de la Reforma
- Isaac
- La Primavera
- Las Danaides, Alameda Central
- Malgré Tout, Alameda Central
- Monument to Christopher Columbus (Buenavista, Mexico City)
- Monument to Christopher Columbus (Paseo de la Reforma)
- Monument to Cuauhtémoc, Paseo de la Reforma
- Monument to Enrico Martínez
- Monument to Lázaro Cárdenas
- Monumento a los Niños Héroes
- Monumento de la Fundación de México-Tenochtitlan
- Monumento a la Madre
- Mustafa Kemal Atatürk Monument
- Neo Ta Memes
- Obelisco a los Niños Héroes
- País de volcanes (2003)
- Puerta 1808
- Statue of Alexander von Humboldt, Alameda Central
- Statue of Franklin D. Roosevelt, Chapultepec
- Statue of Heydar Aliyev
- Statue of José Gervasio Artigas
- Statue of León Felipe
- Statue of Louis Pasteur
- Statue of Martin Luther King Jr., Lincoln Park
- Statue of Paul P. Harris, American Park
- Statue of Pope John Paul II
- Statue of Tin Tan
- Statue of Vicente Guerrero
- Statues of Pegasus
- Tlali (proposed)
- Torres de Satélite
- Un Pescador

== See also ==
- List of statues on Paseo de la Reforma
