= Statue of Francisco I. Madero =

Statue of Francisco I. Madero may refer to:

- Equestrian statue of Francisco I. Madero, Mexico City, Mexico
- Statue of Francisco I. Madero (Guadalajara), Jalisco, Mexico
