= Statue of Venustiano Carranza =

Statue in Guadalajara, Jalisco, Mexico

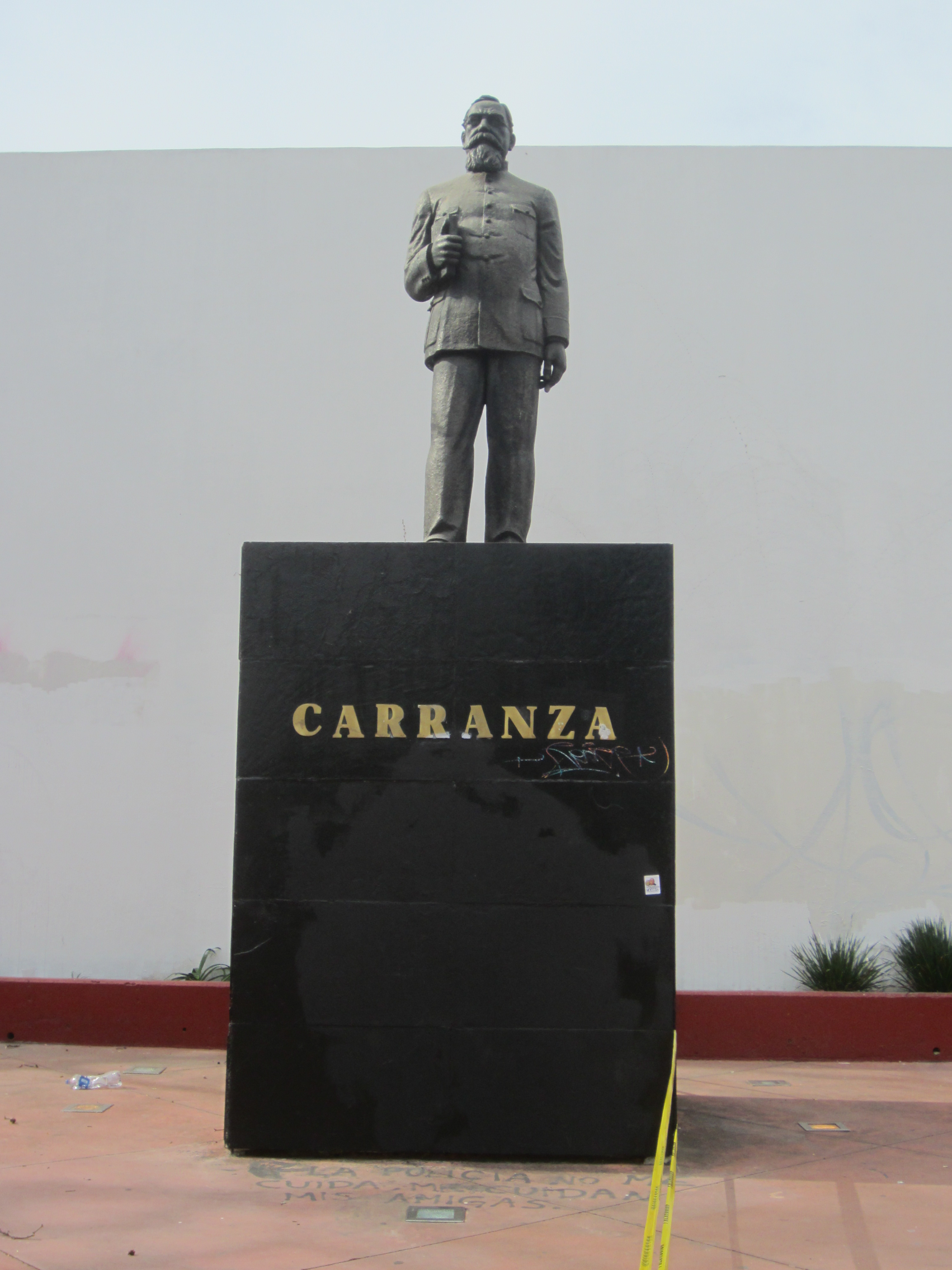
- The statue in 2021
- Subject: Venustiano Carranza
- Location: Guadalajara, Jalisco, Mexico; 20°40′29.1″N 103°21′19.7″W

A statue of Venustiano Carranza is installed in Guadalajara's Parque Revolución, in the Mexican state of Jalisco.
