= El Sol Rojo =

Alexander Calder sculpture in Mexico City

El Sol Rojo (The Red Sun)
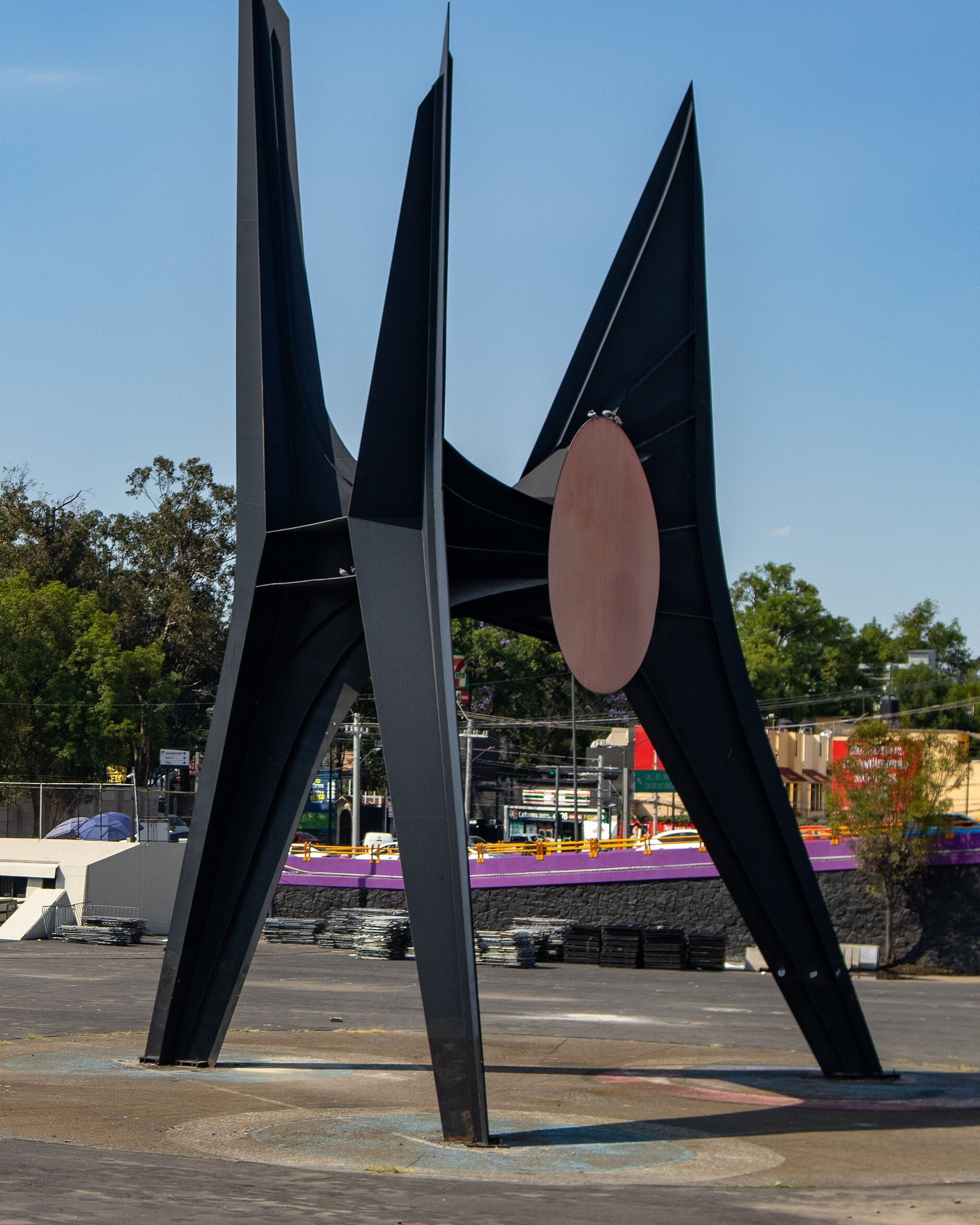
- The sculpture in 2026
- Artist: Alexander Calder
- Year: 1968
- Dimensions: 25.8 m (85 ft)
- Condition: Restored in 2009
- Location: Mexico City; 19°18′8.2″N 99°8′51.3″W
- Owner: Indeterminate (none recognized)
- Website: mexico68.org

El Sol Rojo ('The Red Sun') is an outdoor steel sculpture in Mexico City. It was created by the American artist Alexander Calder for the 1968 Summer Olympics, specifically for the Ruta de la Amistad art project, and it was installed on the grounds of Estadio Azteca.

== History and description ==
In March 1967, the Mexican-German sculptor Mathias Goeritz was commissioned to develop an art project, which would be part of the 1968 Cultural Olympiad ahead of that year's Olympic Games. Multiple artists were invited, and 19 of them and their respective artworks were selected, and the project was named the Ruta de la Amistad ('Path of Friendship'). Among them was Alexander Calder, who sent his proposal to Goeritz on 8 November 1967. Calder supervised the erection after that Christmas.

El Sol Rojo was installed on the main plaza adjacent to Estadio Azteca. It is a 25.8-meter (85 ft)-tall black steel structure. It features three legs, which, unlike many of Calder's other works, are welded and assembled without the use of bolts. At its center is a large red disk, the tone of which changes depending on the position of the sun, as it glows brightly at midday and appears dim at dawn and dusk.

When Sol Rojo was inaugurated, the sculpture featured a white-and-blue psychedelic floor bearing the Mexico 68 logotype, which remained in place for the 1970 FIFA World Cup, also hosted by Mexico. By the 1986 FIFA World Cup, an orange circle had been added. From then on, maintenance of the sculpture declined. Despite its location, the sculpture is not owned by the stadium's proprietors. Although the land belongs to the city government, the borough of Coyoacán unofficially administers it due to the absence of a legal owner, as neither the federal nor city authorities have claimed responsibility for the sculpture.

The group Patronato Ruta de la Amistad ('Path of Friendship Trust') oversees the monuments on the Ruta de la Amistad, and it restored the sculpture in 2009. According to the trust, Sol Rojo is frequently soiled due to its location next to the stadium—where the paving is in poor condition, there is graffiti on adjacent walls, street vendors dispose of food grease in the nearby sewers (rendering the area prone to flooding during the rainy season), and football fans who often dispose of litter or mistake Calder's monumental work for a public urinal.

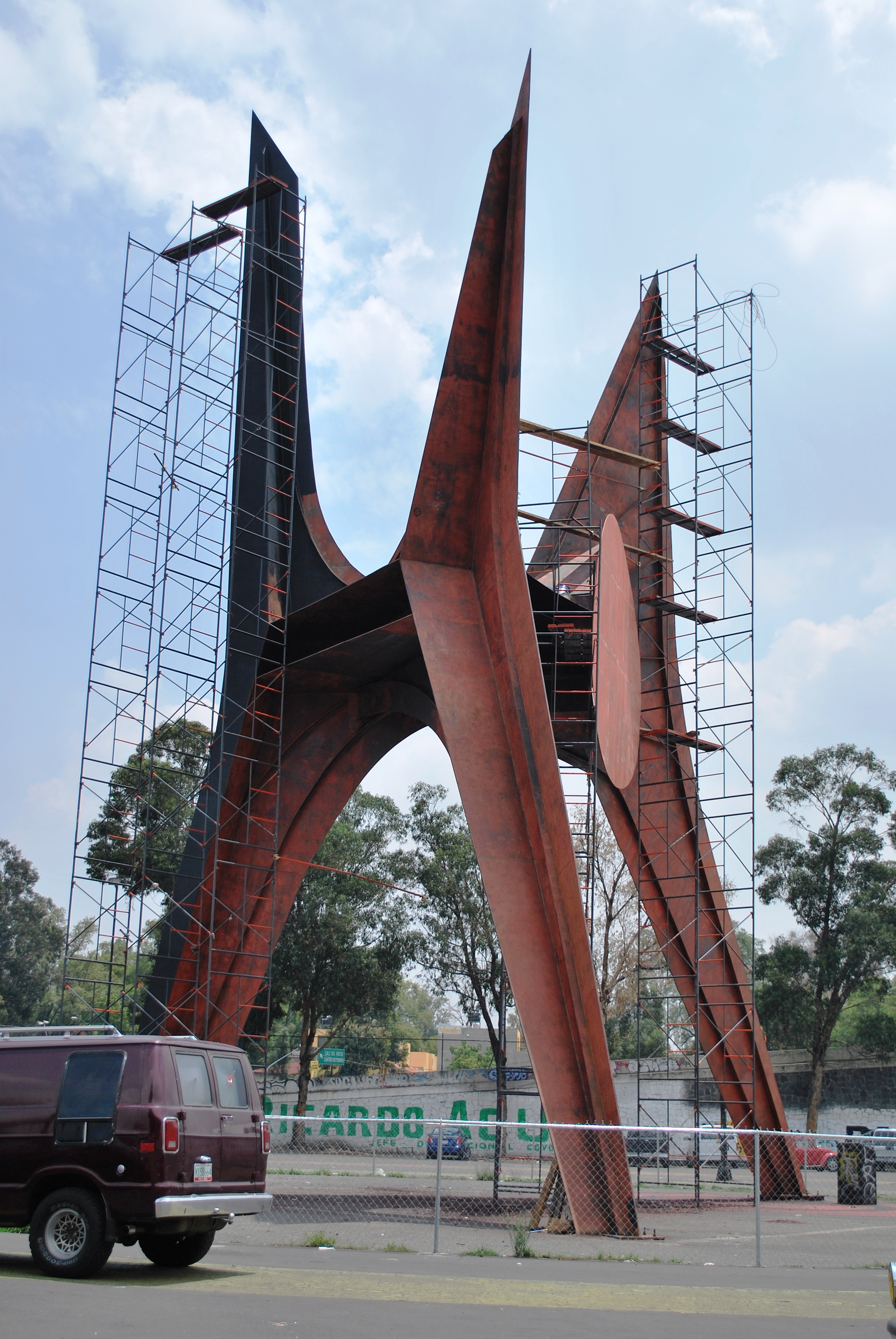
Pictured with scaffolding and without paint while under restoration in 2009

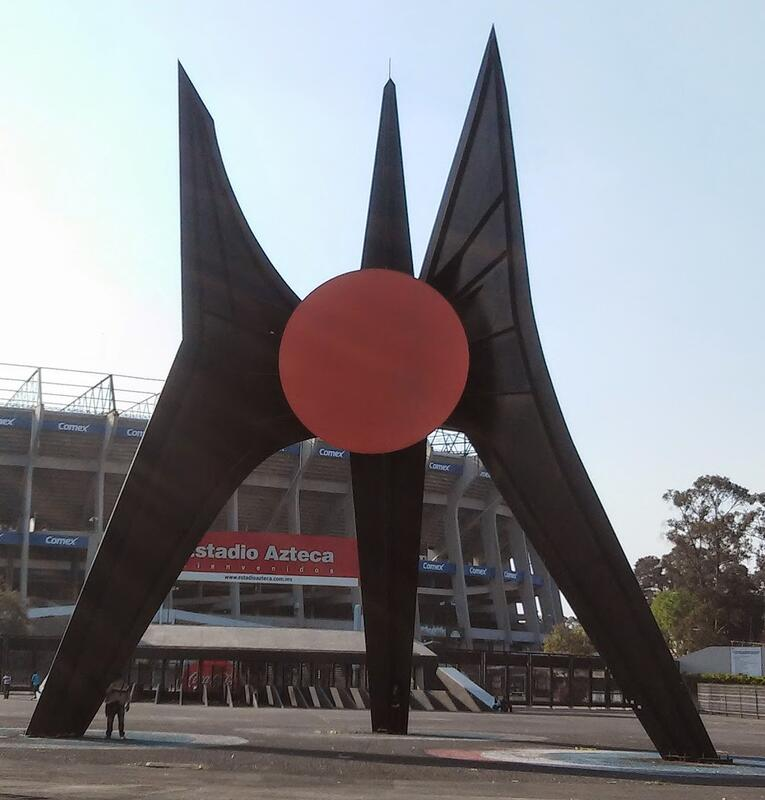
El Sol Rojo in 2015

== See also ==
- Calder Gardens – Sculpture garden and art museum
- List of public art in Mexico City
