= Parque Revolución =

Park in Guadalajara, Jalisco, Mexico

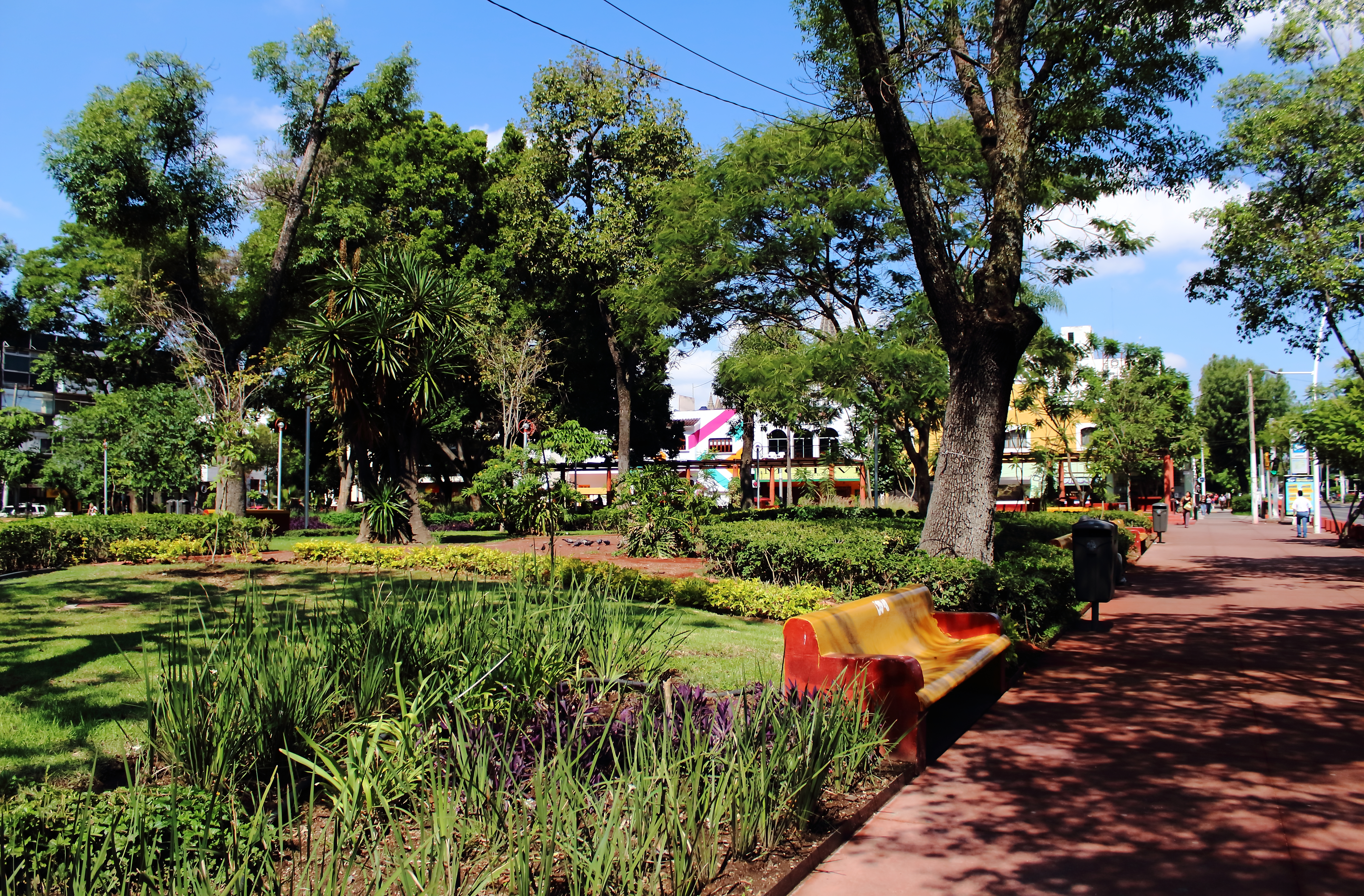
- The park in 2017

- Location within Mexico
- Location: Guadalajara, Jalisco, Mexico
- Coordinates: 20°40′30″N 103°21′21″W

Parque Revolución is a public park in Guadalajara, in the Mexican state of Jalisco.

The park has a statue of Venustiano Carranza and another of Francisco I. Madero.
