= Un Pescador =

Sculpture in Mexico City, Mexico

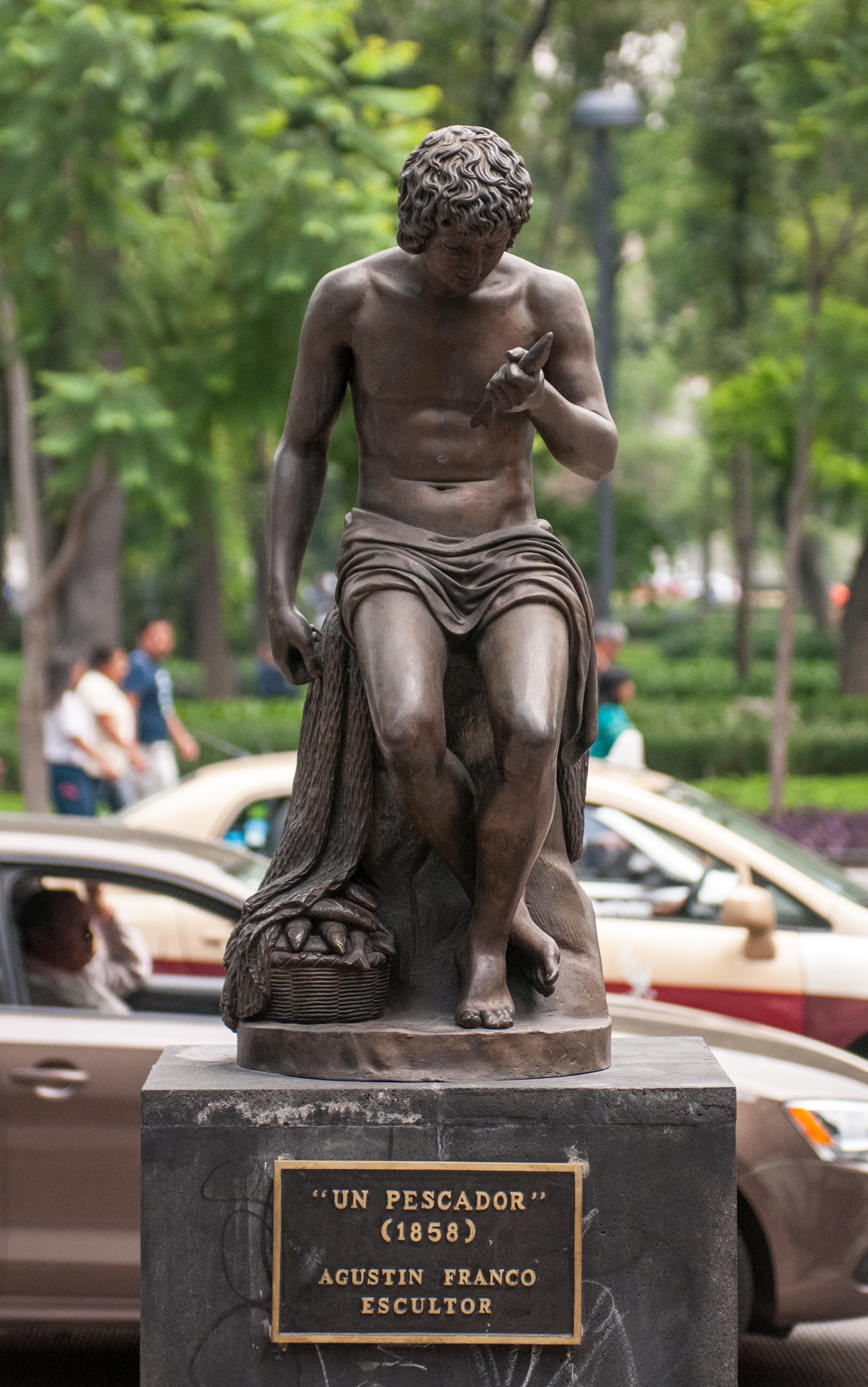
- The statue near Alameda Central, 2015
- Artist: Agustín Franco
- Year: 1858
- Location: Mexico City, Mexico

Un Pescador is a sculpture by Agustín Franco. There is a statue in the collection of Museo Nacional de Arte, and a statue installed across from Alameda Central, in Mexico City.

== See also ==
- 1858 in art
