= Bust of Cuauhtémoc =

Sculpture in Mexico City, Mexico

- The Cuauhtémoc bust in 2026
- Artist: Jesús Fructuoso Contreras
- Year: late 19th century
- Medium: Bronze sculpture
- Location: Mexico City, Mexico; 19°25′58″N 99°08′00″W

The bust of Cuauhtémoc was created by artist Jesús Fructuoso Contreras at the end of the 19th century. It was originally conceived by the artist as part of a set of sculptures of important Mexican historical figures that were installed in the Paseo de la Reforma between the years 1895 and 1899; however, the bust went on to spend many years housed in the atrium of the Mexico City Metropolitan Cathedral and only seen by the public during commemoration ceremonies. In 2007, as part of a remodeling effort in the Centro Histórico, the bust was moved to its current location at the Plaza de la Constitucion in Mexico City, Mexico.

== See also ==
- Indigenismo in Mexico
