= Monumento de la Fundación de México-Tenochtitlan =

Sculpture in Mexico City, Mexico

Monumento a la Fundación de México-Tenochtitlán
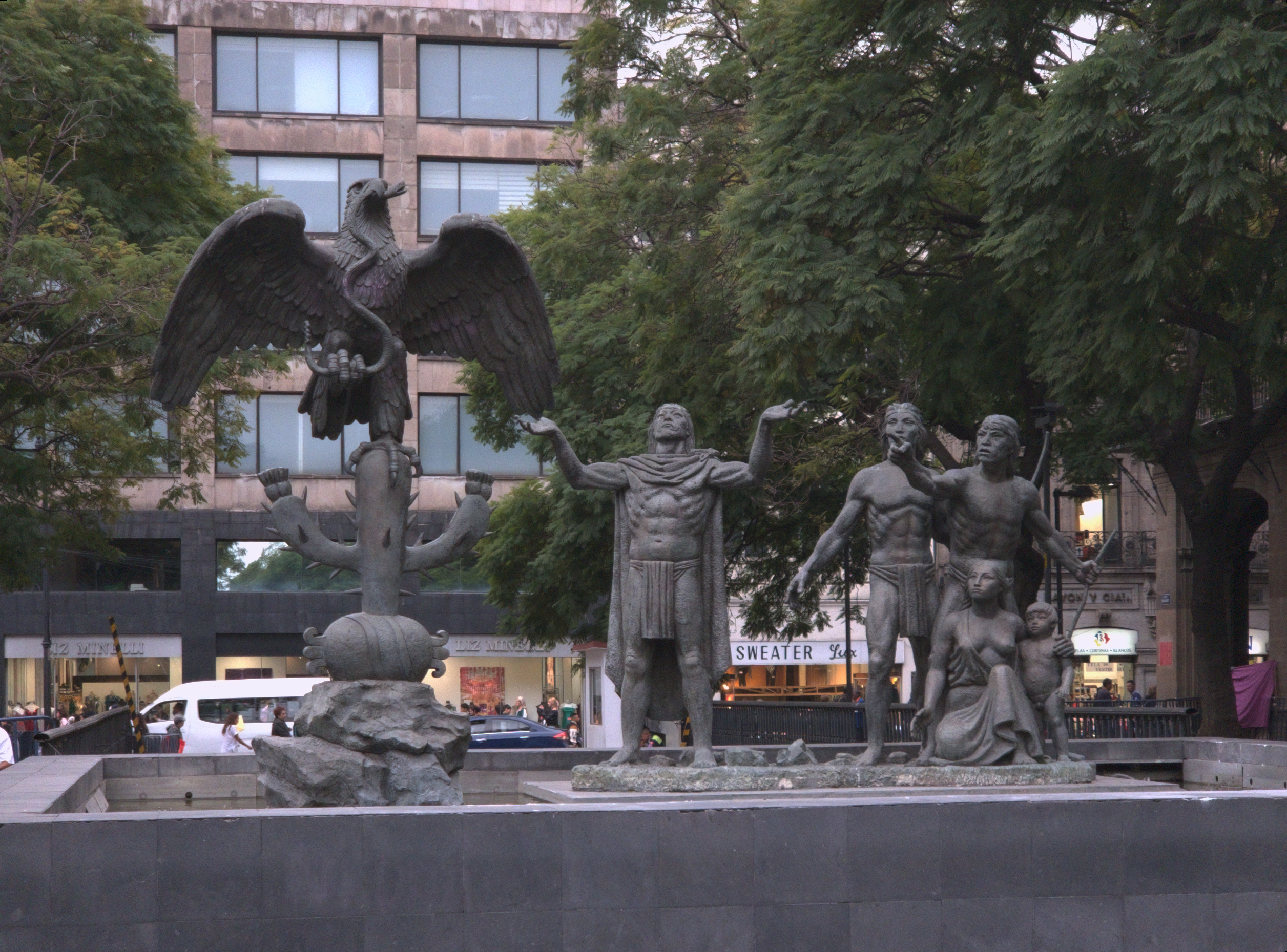
- The monument in 2023
- Interactive map of Monumento a la Fundación de México-Tenochtitlán
- Location: José María Pino Suárez 2, Centro Histórico, Centro, 06000 Ciudad de México, CDMX, Mexico
- Coordinates: 19.43125°N 99.13247°W
- Designer: Carlos Marquina
- Dedicated date: 1970

The Monumento a la Fundación de México-Tenochtitlán is a public monument installed near the government offices in the historic center of Mexico City, Mexico. The monument, designed by Carlos Marquina, was dedicated in 1970. Part of the sculpture depicts an eagle atop a cactus, eating a snake, representative to the imagery on the flag of Mexico and further to the founding of Tenochtitlan, the capital of the Aztec Empire.

== Gallery ==
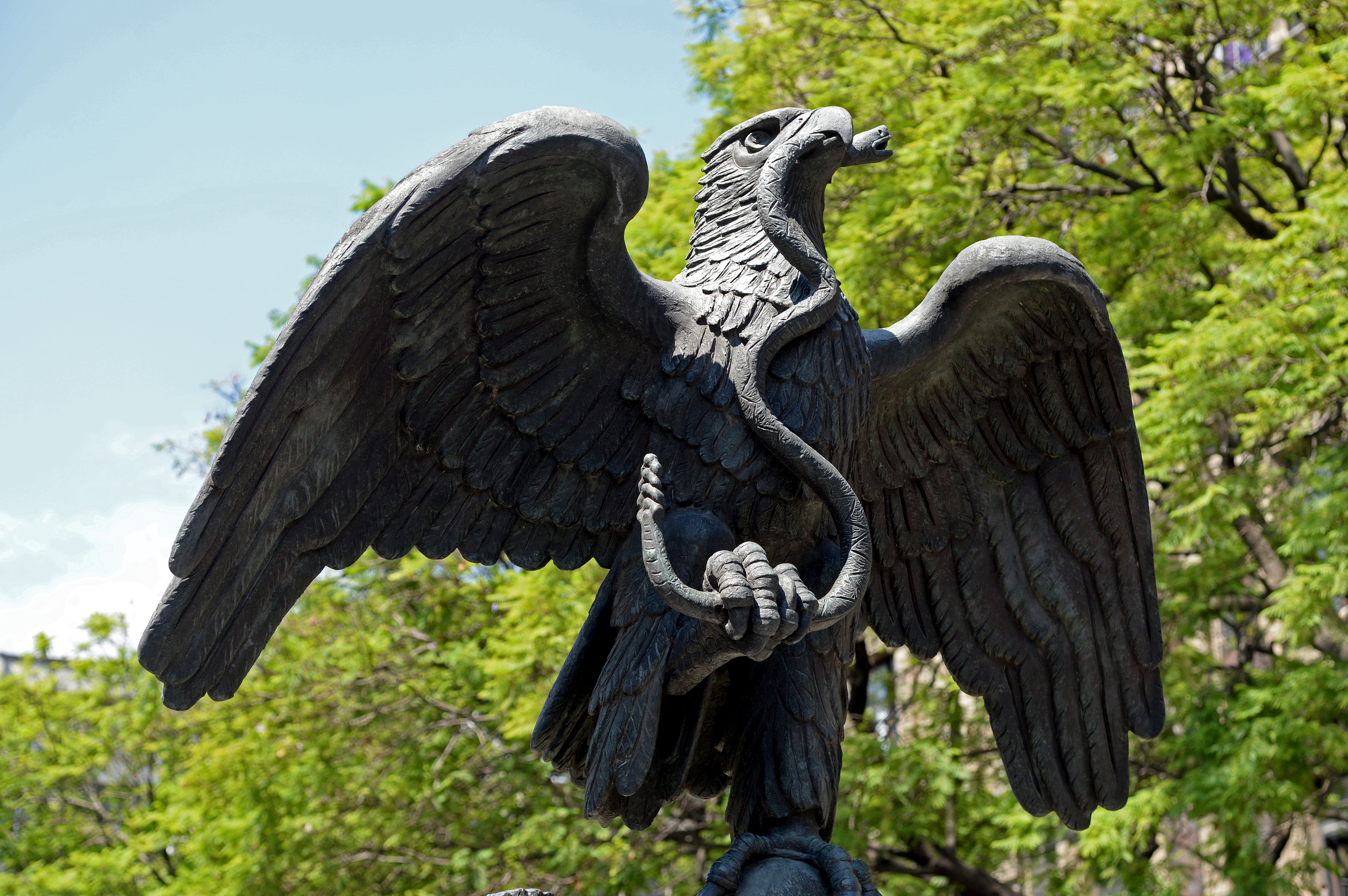

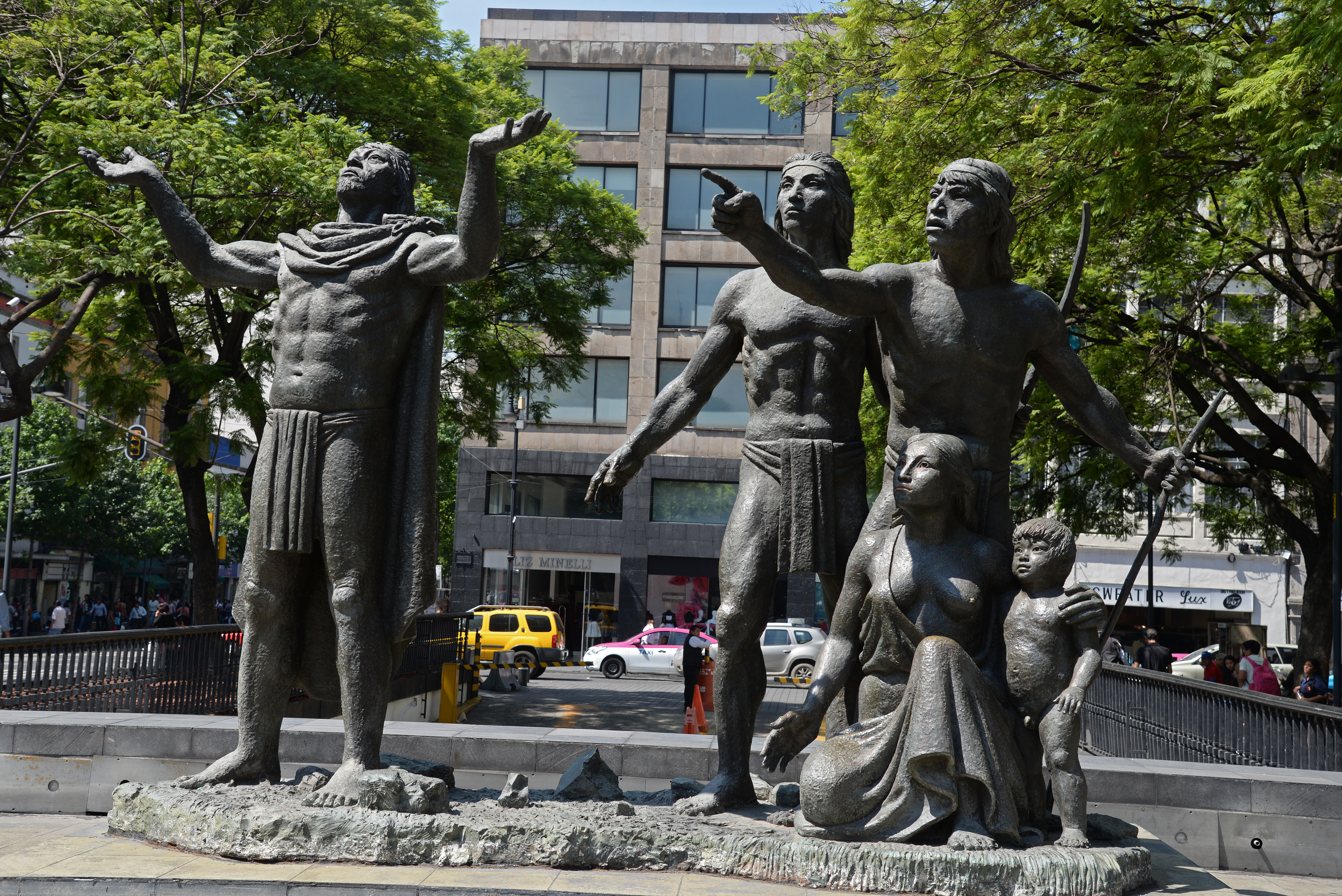

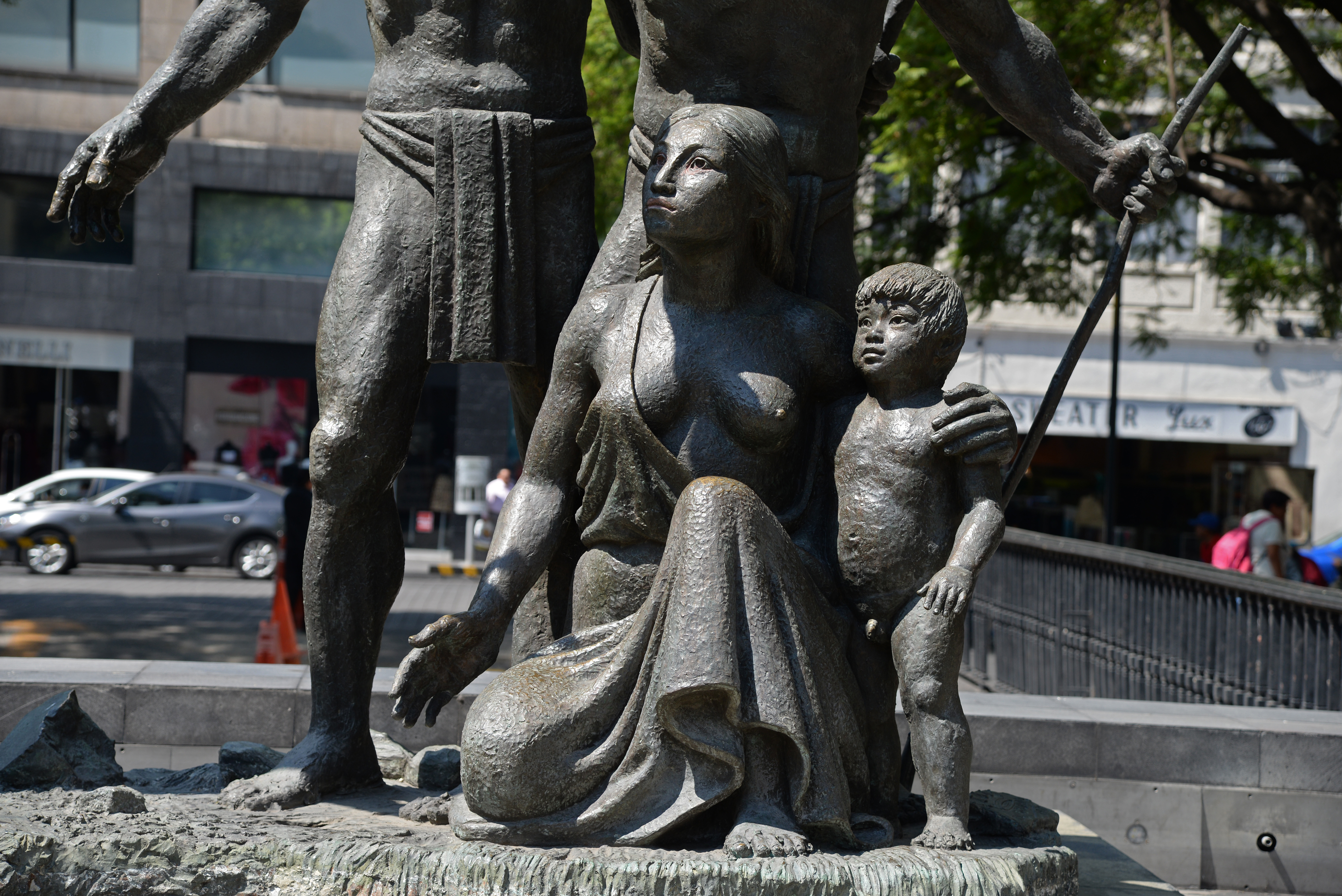
