= Statue of Vicente Guerrero, Mexico City =

Statue in Mexico City, Mexico

Statue of Vicente Guerrero
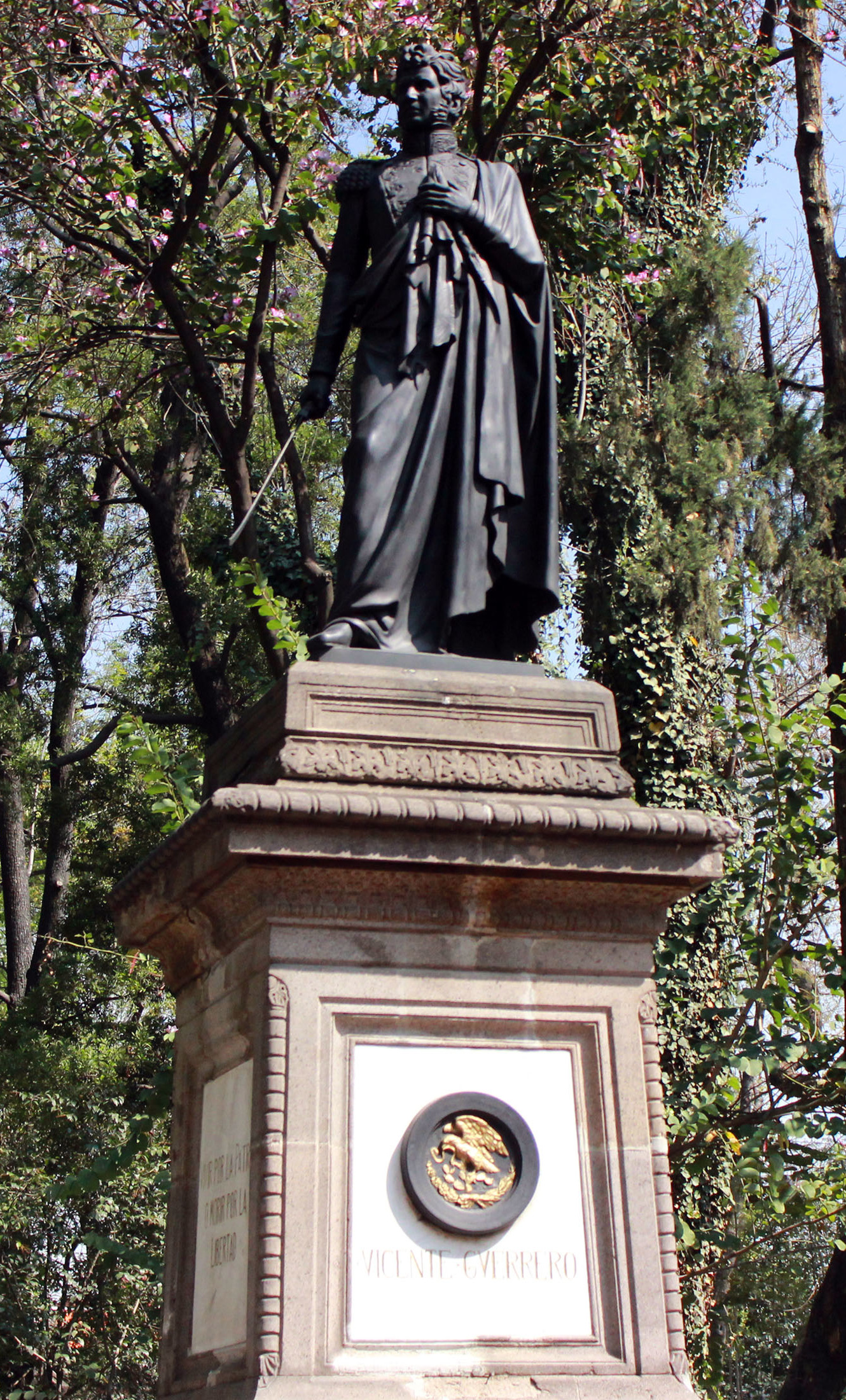
- The monument in 2018
- Subject: Vicente Guerrero
- Location: Mexico City, Mexico; 19°26′18.5″N 99°8′55.2″W

The statue of Vicente Guerrero, a hero of independence and president of Mexico until he was driven from the presidency by conservatives, was installed in Mexico City's Plaza de San Fernando, in 1870. The installation follows the defeat of Mexican conservatives and reestablishment of the republic under liberal control. The bronze sculpture was created from the model in plaster by Mexican sculptor, Miguel Noreña (1839-1894). Noreña is best known for his sculpture topping the Monument to Cuauhtémoc, the last Aztec emperor.
