= Statue of Louis Pasteur, Mexico City =

Statue in Mexico City, Mexico

Statue of Louis Pasteur
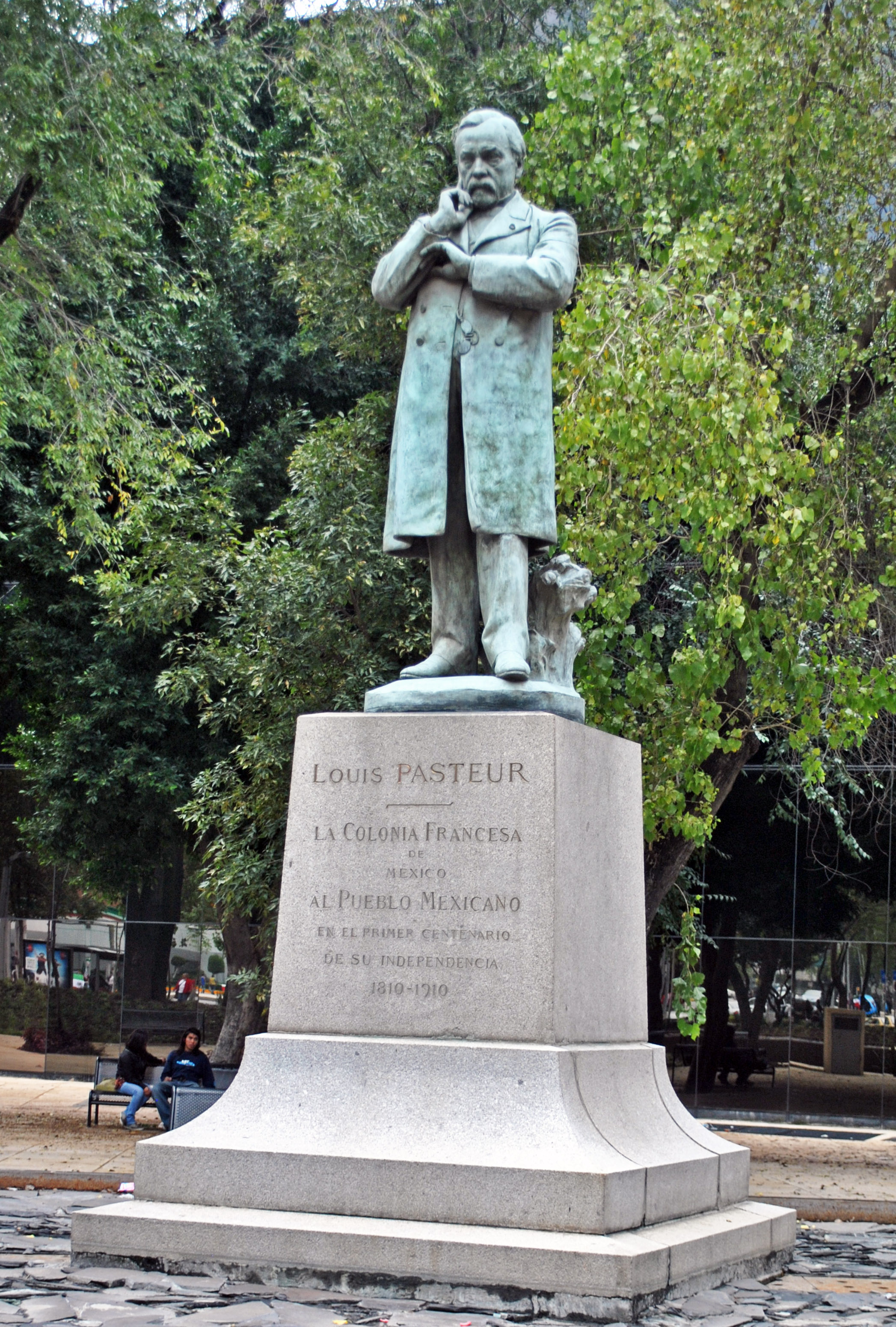
- The statue in 2012
- Subject: Louis Pasteur
- Location: Mexico City, Mexico; 19°25′54.9″N 99°9′30.6″W

The statue of Louis Pasteur is installed in Mexico City, Mexico. The sculpture was gifted by the city's French community to commemorate the centenary of Mexican independence.
