= Isaac (Calvo) =

Sculpture in Mexico City, Mexico

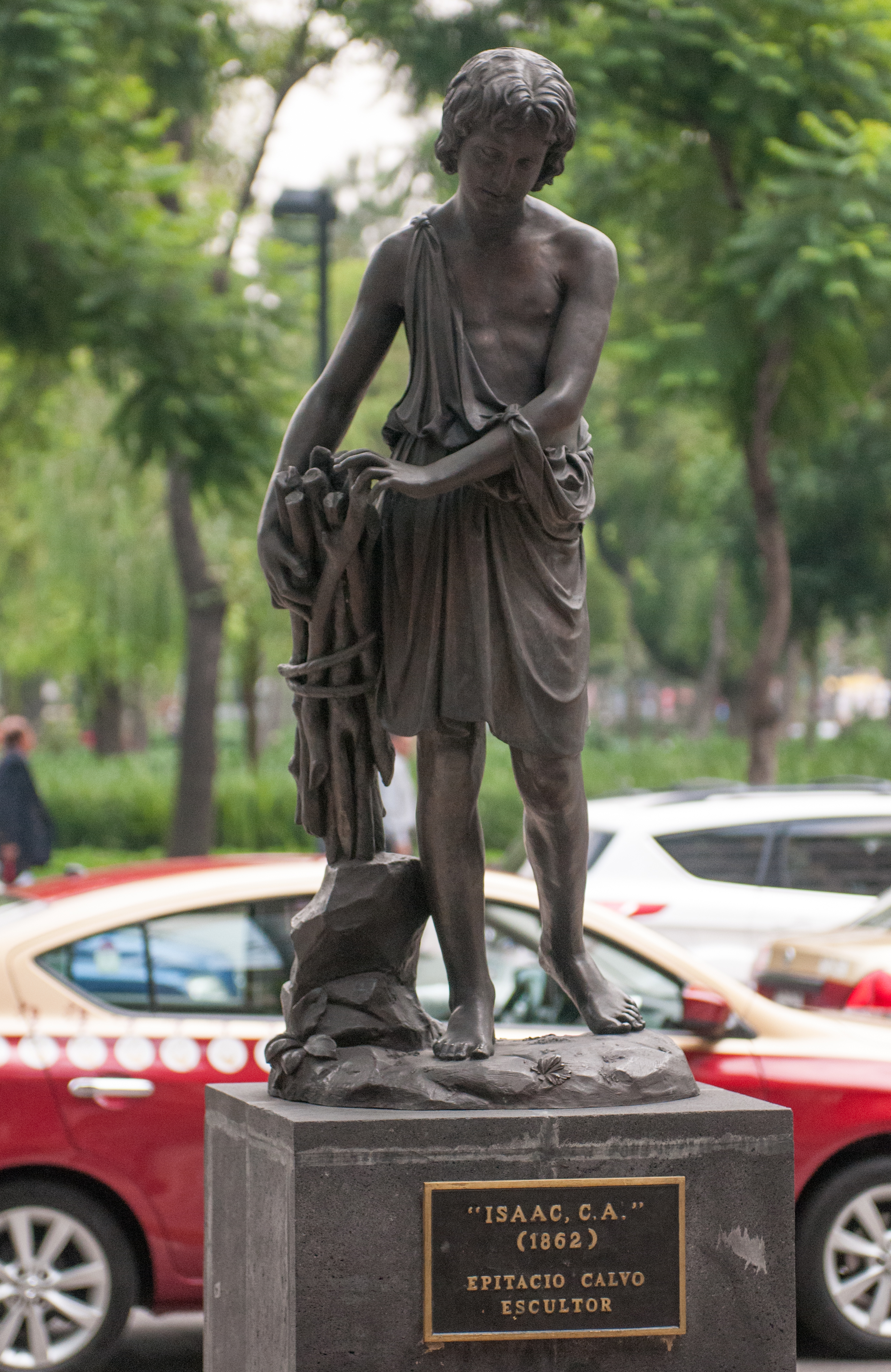
- The statue in Mexico City in 2015
- Artist: Epitacio Calvo
- Year: c. 1861
- Medium: Platinated plaster
- 19°25′0.64″N 99°10′2.77″W

Isaac is a statue by Epitacio Calvo.

One copy is installed in a fountain across from Alameda Central in Mexico City, Mexico.
