= Statue of Francisco I. Madero (Guadalajara) =

Statue in Guadalajara, Jalisco, Mexico

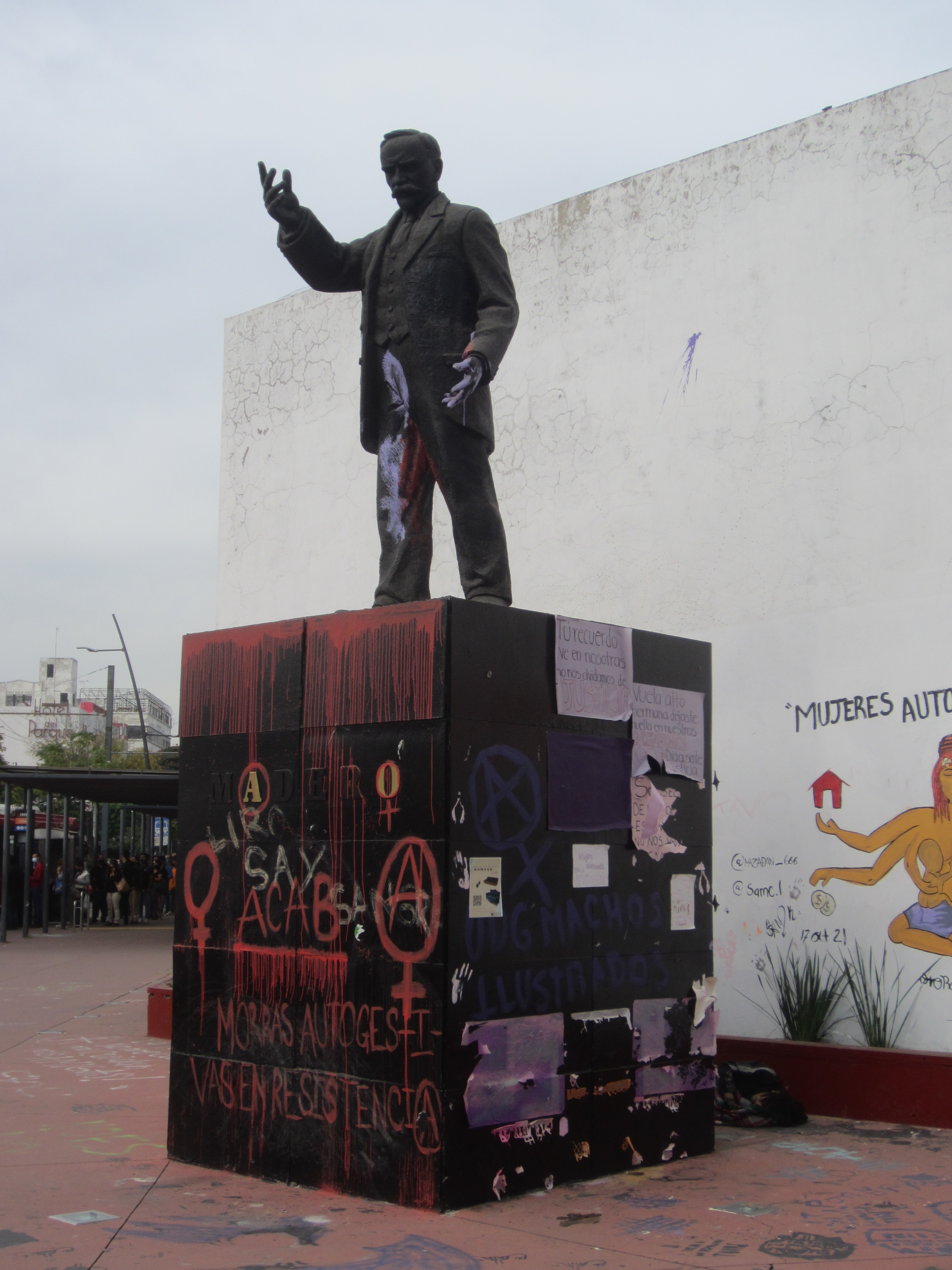
- The statue in 2021
- Subject: Francisco I. Madero
- Location: Guadalajara, Jalisco, Mexico; 20°40′30.2″N 103°21′19.7″W

A statue of Francisco I. Madero is installed in Guadalajara's Parque Revolución, in the Mexican state of Jalisco. The statue was vandalized during the 2020 International Women's Day march.
