= Monument to Enrico Martínez =

Sculpture in Mexico City, Mexico

- Monumento Hipsográfico
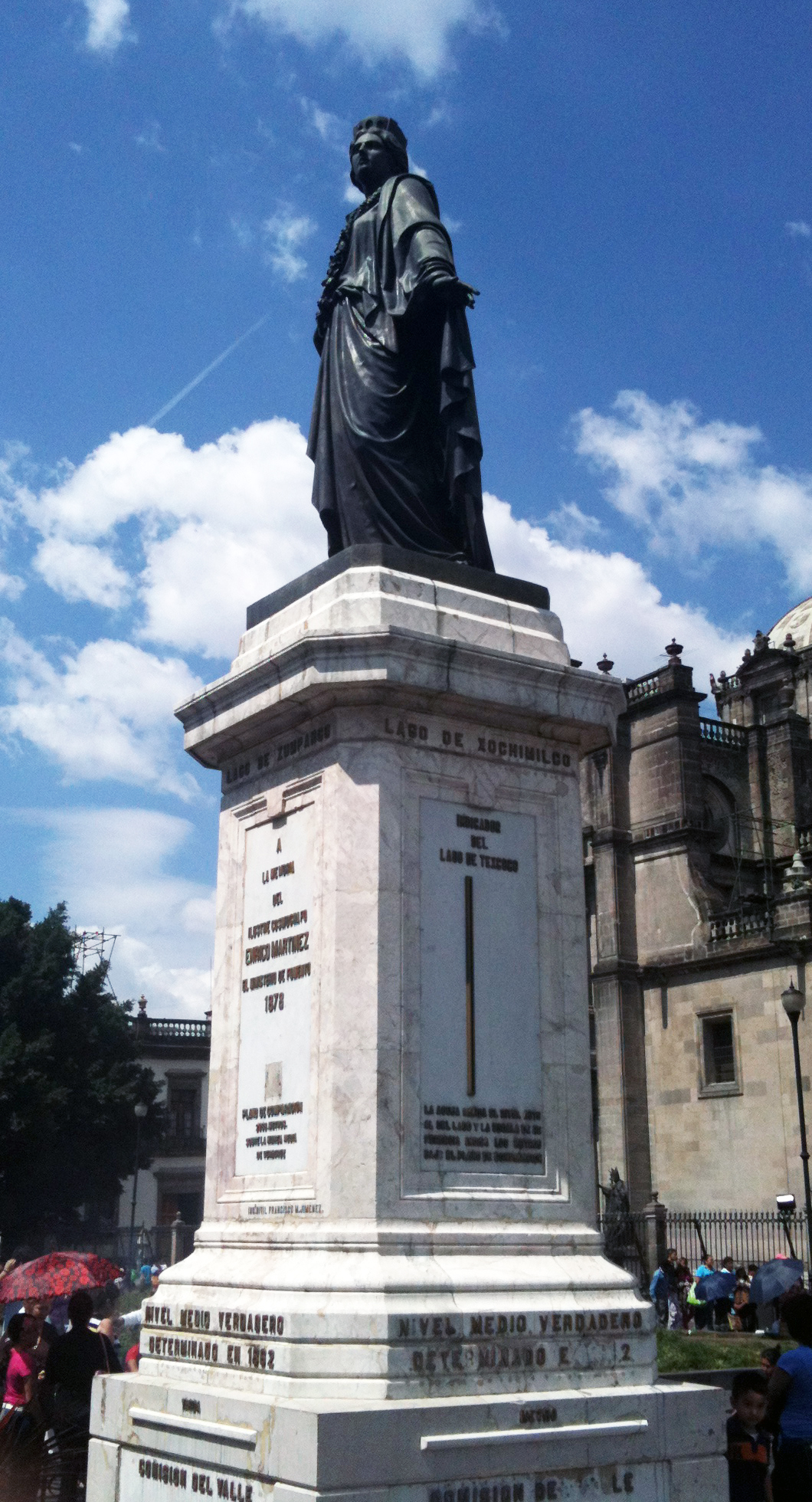
- The monument in 2012
- Artist: Francisco Jiménez (architect); Miguel Noreña (sculptor)
- Year: 5 May 1881; 145 years ago
- Movement: Neoclassicism
- Dimensions: 8 m (26 ft)
- Location: Mexico City, Mexico; 19°26′2.2″N 99°8′1.9″W

The monument to Enrico Martínez, also known as Monumento Hipsográfico (transl. Hypsographic Monument), is installed next to the Mexico City Metropolitan Cathedral and Zócalo, in the historic center of Mexico City, Mexico. It comprises a bronze statue on a marble pedestal, and honors Enrico Martínez, a cosmographer from the realm of the Crown of Castile who sought methods to mitigate floods during the Colonial period of Mexico City.

Francisco Jiménez designed the monument and Miguel Noreña the sculpture. The monument was created between 1877 and 1881 as a hypsographic marker at the request of the Mexican politician Vicente Riva Palacio. The pedestal features indicators showing the water levels of nearby, or formerly existing, lakes, marking their acceptable limits. The sculpture depicts a woman representing Mexico City.

== History and description ==
Enrico Martínez was a cosmographer of the Crown of Castile during the reign of Philip II of Spain (1556–1598), who sought methods to mitigate floods during the Colonial period of Mexico City, as it was built over Lake Texcoco. During the early years of Spanish rule in New Spain, the viceroys Juan de Mendoza y Luna, Marquis of Montesclaros (1603–1607), and Luis de Velasco, 1st Marquess of Salinas del Río Pisuerga (1590–1595; 1607–1611), observed severe flooding in the metropolitan area and requested the construction of dikes to serve as drainage works.

Initially, it was decided not to construct a drainage system and to rely instead on dikes due to budget constraints and a lack of labor; however, on 21 September 1629 the city was flooded for five years. Martínez died in 1632 leaving the work unfinished. Thereafter, successive governments adapted the drainage system, which was ultimately completed during the ruling of Porfirio Díaz, whose administration sought to honor Martínez. Vicente Riva Palacio, Díaz's Secretary of Development, described him as a "man of great activity, unbreakable perseverance, and vast knowledge; he had been appointed royal cosmographer by the king and served as an interpreter for the Inquisition. He was also a book printer, astrologer, phrenologist, and hydraulic mathematician; yet, beyond all this, the colossal drainage works of the Valley of Mexico alone would have sufficed to immortalize him".

Francisco Jiménez was commissioned to design the monument, and Miguel Noreña to execute the sculpture. The project began in July 1877, and it was inaugurated on 5 May 1881. The result features a neoclassical bronze statue on a marble pedestal made from marble quarried in Tepeaca, Puebla.

On its sides, the pedestal displays the official geographic coordinates of Mexico City, the latitudes and longitudes of four lakes near or formerly near Mexico City: Lake Zumpango at the front of the sculpture, Lake Xochimilco to the left, Lake Tlalocan at the back, and Lake San Cristóbal to the right, and the official measurements of the meter, the yard, and the vara. Furthermore, each side indicated the acceptable water level for each lake to prevent potential flooding.

The woman in the sculpture is a matron, and is depicted as laurel-crowned and wearing a toga. The statue stands 8 meters (26 ft) tall and is intended to represent Mexico City. Surrounding the monument is an iron grille adorned with bronze candelabrum details.

The monument was formerly located at the corner of Moneda and Seminario Streets, near the National Palace and southeast of the Mexico City Metropolitan Cathedral; however, in 1924 it was relocated to the southwest of the cathedral. Following the relocation, the orientations of the lakes were no longer correctly displayed.

The monument inspired the name of the oldest cantina in the city, El Nivel, which operated from 1857 to 2008.

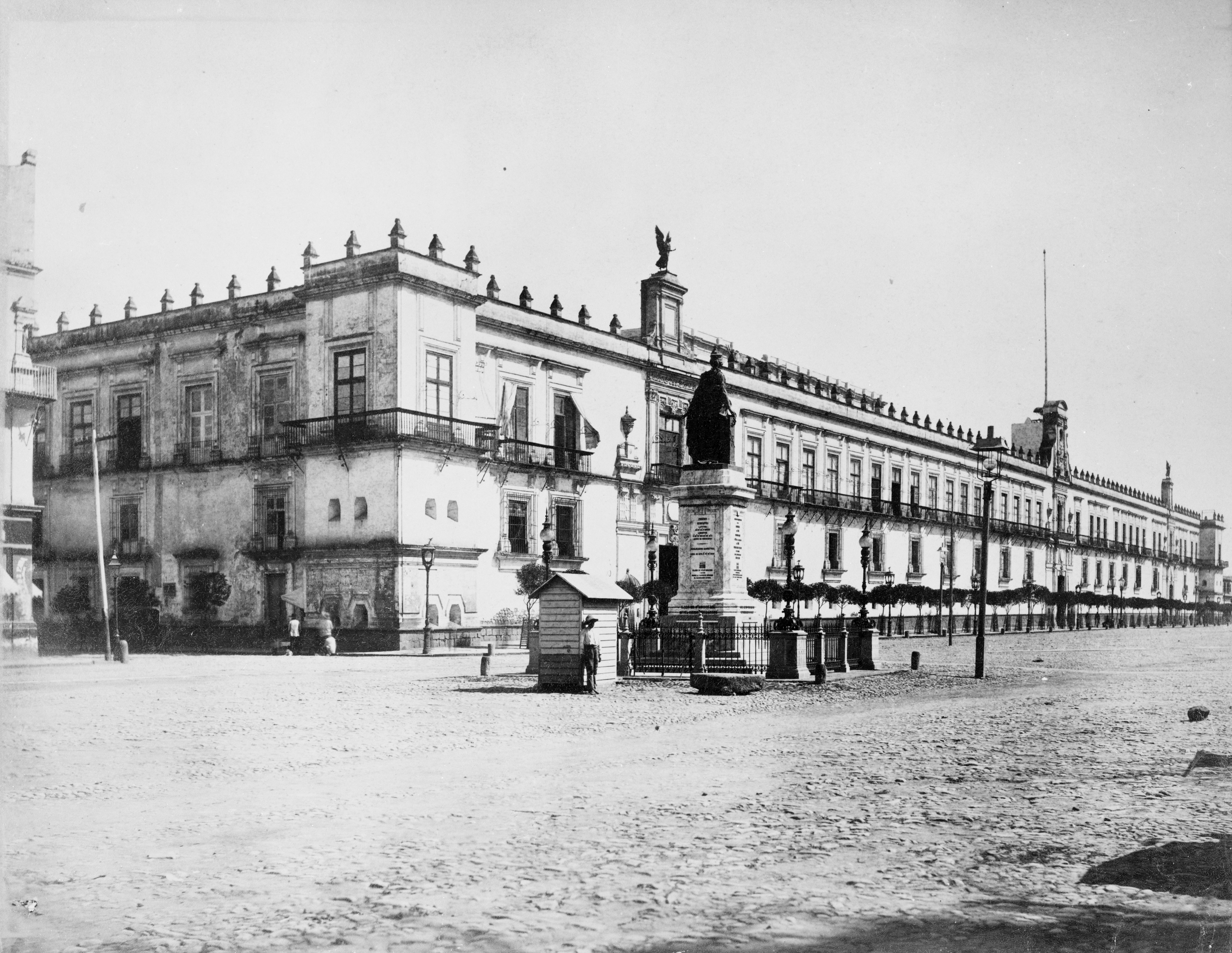
The monument in its original location near the National Palace c. 1900

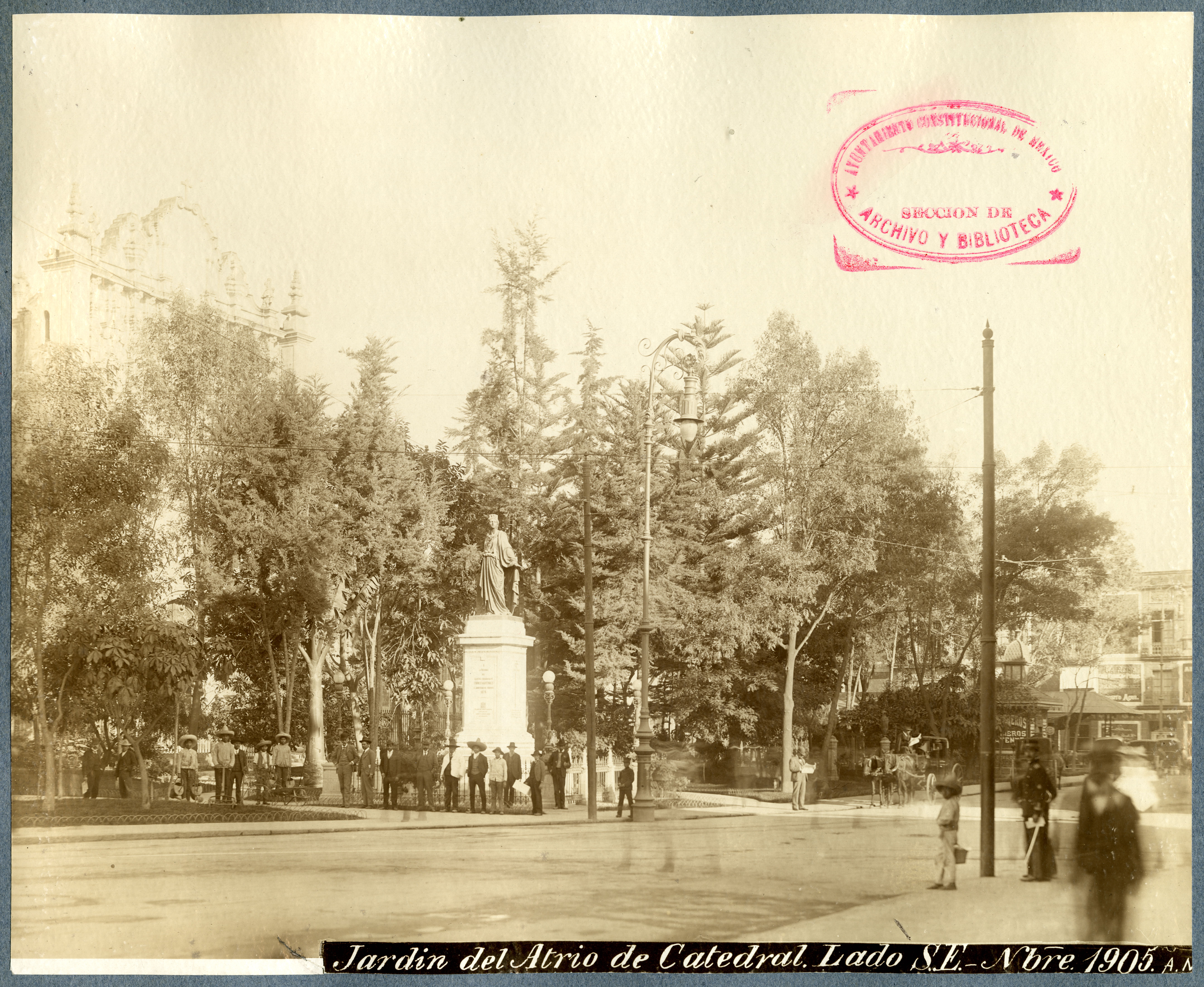
The monument in 1905

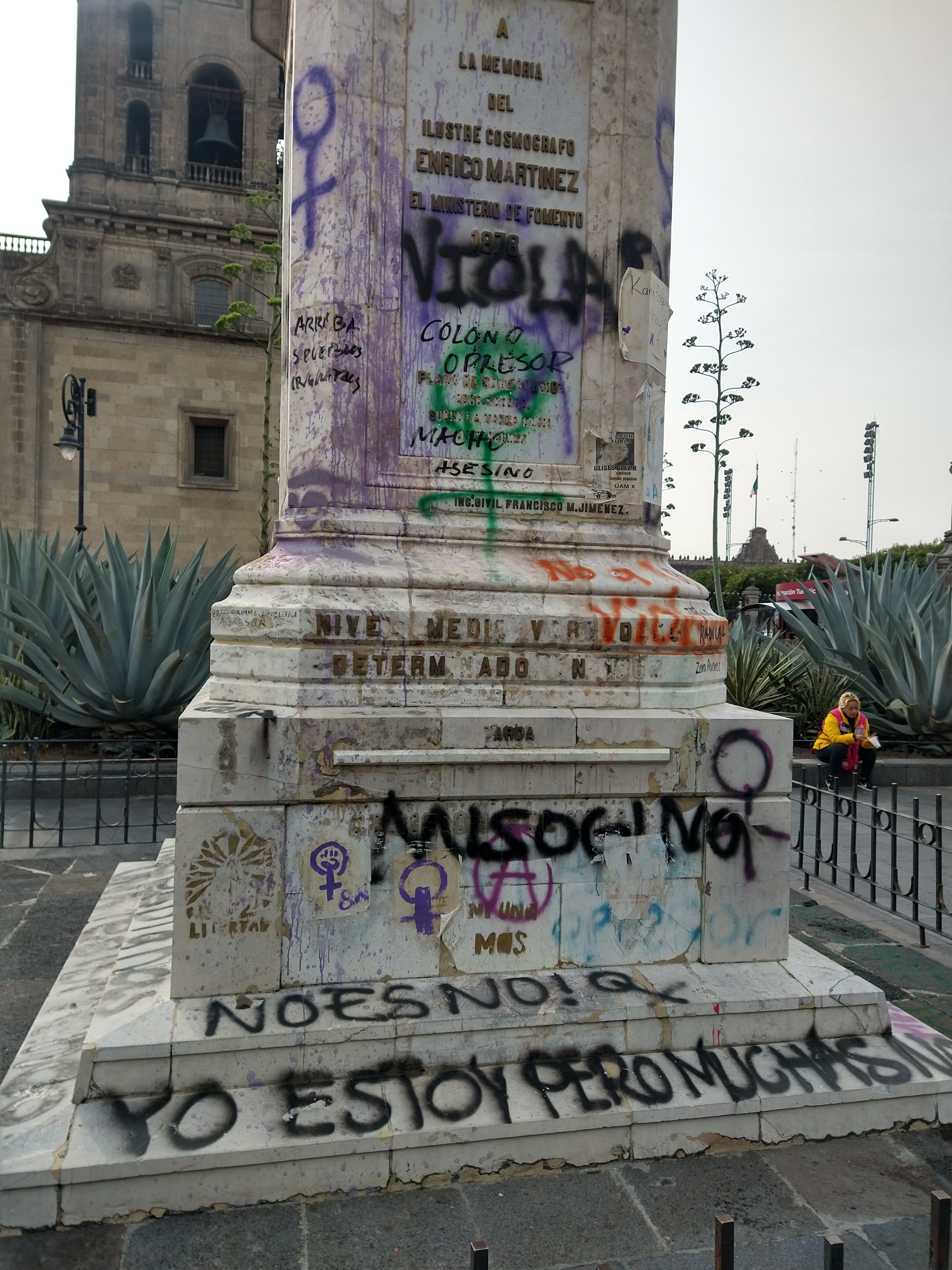
The monument with graffiti in 2022
