= Equestrian statue of Francisco I. Madero =

Statue in Mexico City, Mexico

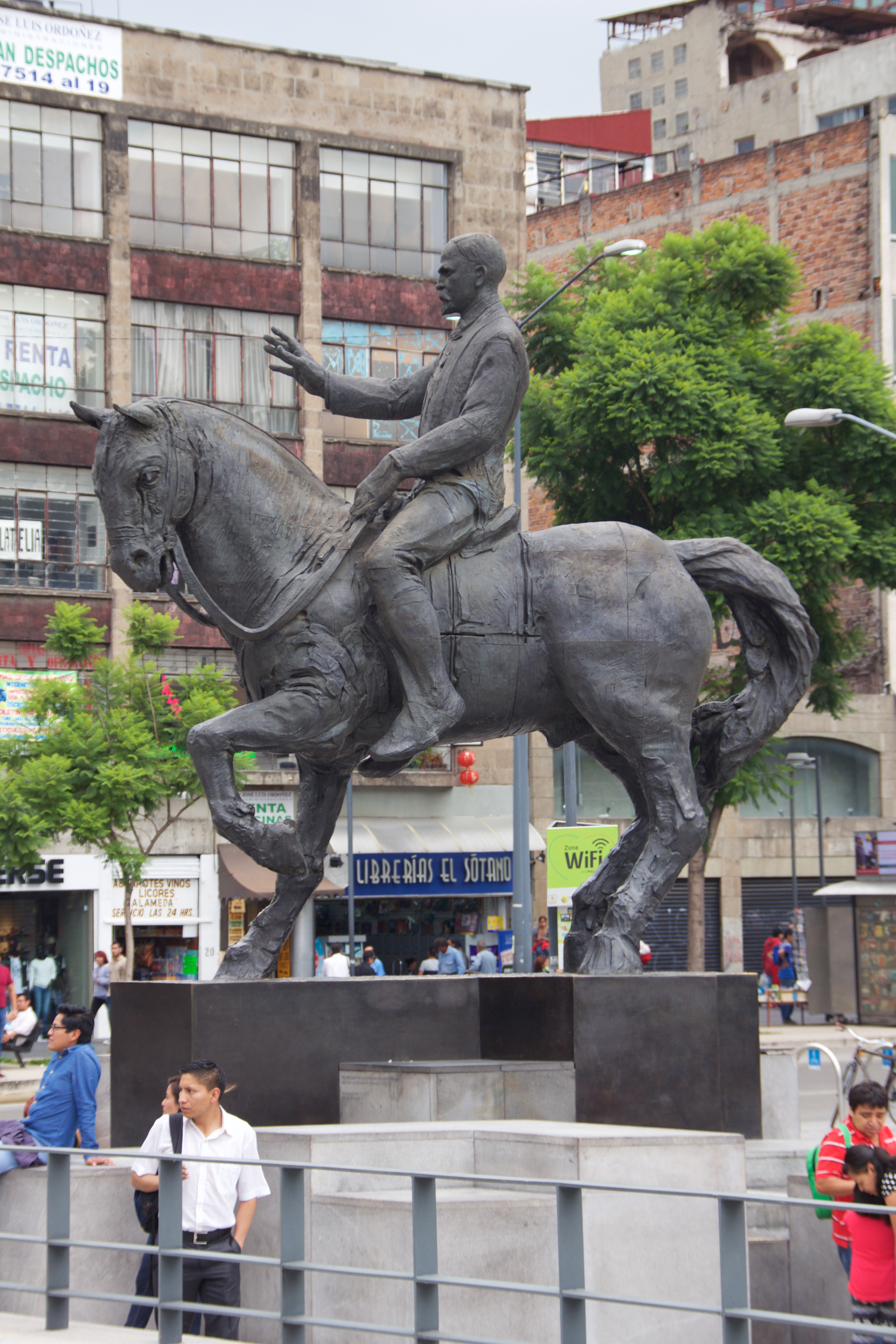
- The statue in 2015
- Location in Mexico City
- Subject: Francisco I. Madero
- Location: Palacio de Bellas Artes; Mexico City; 19°26′4.05″N 99°8′31.19″W

The equestrian statue of Francisco I. Madero is installed outside the Palacio de Bellas Artes in Mexico City, Mexico.
